

474001–474100 

|-bgcolor=#d6d6d6
| 474001 ||  || — || January 7, 2005 || Kitt Peak || Spacewatch || — || align=right | 2.2 km || 
|-id=002 bgcolor=#fefefe
| 474002 ||  || — || March 3, 2005 || Kitt Peak || Spacewatch || — || align=right data-sort-value="0.72" | 720 m || 
|-id=003 bgcolor=#fefefe
| 474003 ||  || — || February 1, 2012 || Kitt Peak || Spacewatch || — || align=right data-sort-value="0.64" | 640 m || 
|-id=004 bgcolor=#E9E9E9
| 474004 ||  || — || June 16, 2004 || Kitt Peak || Spacewatch || — || align=right | 2.0 km || 
|-id=005 bgcolor=#E9E9E9
| 474005 ||  || — || August 20, 2008 || Kitt Peak || Spacewatch || — || align=right | 2.8 km || 
|-id=006 bgcolor=#d6d6d6
| 474006 ||  || — || April 10, 2005 || Kitt Peak || Spacewatch || EOS || align=right | 2.6 km || 
|-id=007 bgcolor=#E9E9E9
| 474007 ||  || — || March 13, 2007 || Mount Lemmon || Mount Lemmon Survey || HOF || align=right | 2.8 km || 
|-id=008 bgcolor=#E9E9E9
| 474008 ||  || — || October 22, 2009 || Mount Lemmon || Mount Lemmon Survey || — || align=right | 1.9 km || 
|-id=009 bgcolor=#fefefe
| 474009 ||  || — || October 8, 2004 || Kitt Peak || Spacewatch || — || align=right data-sort-value="0.72" | 720 m || 
|-id=010 bgcolor=#d6d6d6
| 474010 ||  || — || February 14, 2010 || Kitt Peak || Spacewatch || — || align=right | 3.0 km || 
|-id=011 bgcolor=#fefefe
| 474011 ||  || — || October 18, 2006 || Kitt Peak || Spacewatch || — || align=right | 1.1 km || 
|-id=012 bgcolor=#E9E9E9
| 474012 ||  || — || September 7, 2004 || Kitt Peak || Spacewatch || — || align=right | 1.9 km || 
|-id=013 bgcolor=#d6d6d6
| 474013 ||  || — || March 29, 2000 || Socorro || LINEAR || — || align=right | 2.1 km || 
|-id=014 bgcolor=#fefefe
| 474014 ||  || — || May 4, 2005 || Kitt Peak || Spacewatch || — || align=right data-sort-value="0.81" | 810 m || 
|-id=015 bgcolor=#d6d6d6
| 474015 ||  || — || June 15, 2007 || Kitt Peak || Spacewatch || — || align=right | 3.1 km || 
|-id=016 bgcolor=#d6d6d6
| 474016 ||  || — || April 8, 2010 || WISE || WISE || — || align=right | 4.7 km || 
|-id=017 bgcolor=#E9E9E9
| 474017 ||  || — || September 19, 2008 || Kitt Peak || Spacewatch || — || align=right | 1.9 km || 
|-id=018 bgcolor=#fefefe
| 474018 ||  || — || March 8, 2005 || Mount Lemmon || Mount Lemmon Survey || — || align=right data-sort-value="0.79" | 790 m || 
|-id=019 bgcolor=#fefefe
| 474019 ||  || — || March 11, 2005 || Mount Lemmon || Mount Lemmon Survey || — || align=right data-sort-value="0.66" | 660 m || 
|-id=020 bgcolor=#fefefe
| 474020 ||  || — || February 9, 2005 || Mount Lemmon || Mount Lemmon Survey || MAS || align=right data-sort-value="0.67" | 670 m || 
|-id=021 bgcolor=#fefefe
| 474021 ||  || — || January 12, 1996 || Kitt Peak || Spacewatch || — || align=right data-sort-value="0.65" | 650 m || 
|-id=022 bgcolor=#d6d6d6
| 474022 ||  || — || December 20, 2009 || Catalina || CSS || — || align=right | 2.9 km || 
|-id=023 bgcolor=#fefefe
| 474023 ||  || — || October 9, 2007 || Kitt Peak || Spacewatch || — || align=right data-sort-value="0.86" | 860 m || 
|-id=024 bgcolor=#E9E9E9
| 474024 ||  || — || December 8, 2010 || Kitt Peak || Spacewatch || — || align=right data-sort-value="0.98" | 980 m || 
|-id=025 bgcolor=#fefefe
| 474025 ||  || — || October 28, 2011 || Kitt Peak || Spacewatch || — || align=right data-sort-value="0.69" | 690 m || 
|-id=026 bgcolor=#E9E9E9
| 474026 ||  || — || March 13, 2007 || Catalina || CSS || — || align=right | 1.9 km || 
|-id=027 bgcolor=#d6d6d6
| 474027 ||  || — || April 6, 2005 || Catalina || CSS || — || align=right | 3.3 km || 
|-id=028 bgcolor=#fefefe
| 474028 ||  || — || December 19, 2004 || Mount Lemmon || Mount Lemmon Survey || V || align=right data-sort-value="0.73" | 730 m || 
|-id=029 bgcolor=#E9E9E9
| 474029 ||  || — || February 9, 2007 || Mount Lemmon || Mount Lemmon Survey || MAR || align=right | 1.2 km || 
|-id=030 bgcolor=#d6d6d6
| 474030 ||  || — || July 24, 2010 || WISE || WISE || — || align=right | 4.7 km || 
|-id=031 bgcolor=#E9E9E9
| 474031 ||  || — || March 26, 2007 || Mount Lemmon || Mount Lemmon Survey || — || align=right | 3.2 km || 
|-id=032 bgcolor=#fefefe
| 474032 ||  || — || November 18, 2006 || Mount Lemmon || Mount Lemmon Survey || — || align=right | 1.0 km || 
|-id=033 bgcolor=#E9E9E9
| 474033 ||  || — || May 12, 2007 || Mount Lemmon || Mount Lemmon Survey || — || align=right | 2.8 km || 
|-id=034 bgcolor=#d6d6d6
| 474034 ||  || — || March 10, 2005 || Kitt Peak || Spacewatch || — || align=right | 2.7 km || 
|-id=035 bgcolor=#E9E9E9
| 474035 ||  || — || November 11, 2004 || Anderson Mesa || LONEOS || — || align=right | 2.0 km || 
|-id=036 bgcolor=#d6d6d6
| 474036 ||  || — || May 12, 2011 || Mount Lemmon || Mount Lemmon Survey || — || align=right | 3.4 km || 
|-id=037 bgcolor=#fefefe
| 474037 ||  || — || March 9, 2005 || Mount Lemmon || Mount Lemmon Survey || NYS || align=right data-sort-value="0.65" | 650 m || 
|-id=038 bgcolor=#E9E9E9
| 474038 ||  || — || April 22, 1998 || Kitt Peak || Spacewatch || — || align=right | 2.0 km || 
|-id=039 bgcolor=#fefefe
| 474039 ||  || — || November 13, 2006 || Kitt Peak || Spacewatch || — || align=right | 1.1 km || 
|-id=040 bgcolor=#E9E9E9
| 474040 ||  || — || May 26, 2003 || Kitt Peak || Spacewatch || — || align=right | 3.3 km || 
|-id=041 bgcolor=#E9E9E9
| 474041 ||  || — || September 9, 2004 || Socorro || LINEAR || — || align=right | 1.6 km || 
|-id=042 bgcolor=#C2FFFF
| 474042 ||  || — || October 24, 2009 || Mount Lemmon || Mount Lemmon Survey || L4 || align=right | 10 km || 
|-id=043 bgcolor=#d6d6d6
| 474043 ||  || — || November 2, 2007 || Mount Lemmon || Mount Lemmon Survey || — || align=right | 3.1 km || 
|-id=044 bgcolor=#d6d6d6
| 474044 ||  || — || February 15, 2010 || Kitt Peak || Spacewatch || — || align=right | 2.5 km || 
|-id=045 bgcolor=#E9E9E9
| 474045 ||  || — || March 10, 2007 || Kitt Peak || Spacewatch || — || align=right | 1.1 km || 
|-id=046 bgcolor=#fefefe
| 474046 ||  || — || November 6, 2010 || Mount Lemmon || Mount Lemmon Survey || — || align=right data-sort-value="0.78" | 780 m || 
|-id=047 bgcolor=#fefefe
| 474047 ||  || — || March 9, 2002 || Kitt Peak || Spacewatch || — || align=right data-sort-value="0.61" | 610 m || 
|-id=048 bgcolor=#d6d6d6
| 474048 ||  || — || May 16, 2005 || Mount Lemmon || Mount Lemmon Survey || THB || align=right | 3.3 km || 
|-id=049 bgcolor=#d6d6d6
| 474049 ||  || — || February 12, 2004 || Kitt Peak || Spacewatch || HYG || align=right | 3.4 km || 
|-id=050 bgcolor=#d6d6d6
| 474050 ||  || — || October 5, 2007 || Kitt Peak || Spacewatch || VER || align=right | 4.2 km || 
|-id=051 bgcolor=#E9E9E9
| 474051 ||  || — || October 18, 2009 || Mount Lemmon || Mount Lemmon Survey || — || align=right | 2.7 km || 
|-id=052 bgcolor=#E9E9E9
| 474052 ||  || — || April 9, 1999 || Kitt Peak || Spacewatch || — || align=right | 1.4 km || 
|-id=053 bgcolor=#E9E9E9
| 474053 ||  || — || September 23, 2004 || Kitt Peak || Spacewatch || — || align=right | 1.5 km || 
|-id=054 bgcolor=#fefefe
| 474054 ||  || — || October 15, 1995 || Kitt Peak || Spacewatch || — || align=right data-sort-value="0.98" | 980 m || 
|-id=055 bgcolor=#fefefe
| 474055 ||  || — || September 19, 2006 || Kitt Peak || Spacewatch || — || align=right data-sort-value="0.87" | 870 m || 
|-id=056 bgcolor=#E9E9E9
| 474056 ||  || — || November 25, 2009 || Kitt Peak || Spacewatch || EUN || align=right | 1.5 km || 
|-id=057 bgcolor=#fefefe
| 474057 ||  || — || March 2, 1997 || Kitt Peak || Spacewatch || MAS || align=right data-sort-value="0.86" | 860 m || 
|-id=058 bgcolor=#fefefe
| 474058 ||  || — || January 15, 2005 || Kitt Peak || Spacewatch || — || align=right data-sort-value="0.68" | 680 m || 
|-id=059 bgcolor=#d6d6d6
| 474059 ||  || — || May 8, 2005 || Mount Lemmon || Mount Lemmon Survey || — || align=right | 2.3 km || 
|-id=060 bgcolor=#fefefe
| 474060 ||  || — || March 23, 2006 || Mount Lemmon || Mount Lemmon Survey || — || align=right data-sort-value="0.61" | 610 m || 
|-id=061 bgcolor=#fefefe
| 474061 ||  || — || January 10, 2008 || Kitt Peak || Spacewatch || NYS || align=right data-sort-value="0.69" | 690 m || 
|-id=062 bgcolor=#d6d6d6
| 474062 ||  || — || January 20, 2015 || Mount Lemmon || Mount Lemmon Survey || — || align=right | 3.0 km || 
|-id=063 bgcolor=#E9E9E9
| 474063 ||  || — || October 22, 2005 || Kitt Peak || Spacewatch || EUN || align=right | 1.6 km || 
|-id=064 bgcolor=#E9E9E9
| 474064 ||  || — || October 23, 2009 || Mount Lemmon || Mount Lemmon Survey || MAR || align=right | 1.2 km || 
|-id=065 bgcolor=#d6d6d6
| 474065 ||  || — || November 11, 2009 || Mount Lemmon || Mount Lemmon Survey || — || align=right | 2.3 km || 
|-id=066 bgcolor=#E9E9E9
| 474066 ||  || — || April 15, 2007 || Kitt Peak || Spacewatch || — || align=right | 2.3 km || 
|-id=067 bgcolor=#fefefe
| 474067 ||  || — || March 5, 2006 || Kitt Peak || Spacewatch || H || align=right data-sort-value="0.58" | 580 m || 
|-id=068 bgcolor=#fefefe
| 474068 ||  || — || July 23, 2009 || Siding Spring || SSS || MAS || align=right data-sort-value="0.76" | 760 m || 
|-id=069 bgcolor=#E9E9E9
| 474069 ||  || — || November 30, 2005 || Mount Lemmon || Mount Lemmon Survey || (5) || align=right data-sort-value="0.82" | 820 m || 
|-id=070 bgcolor=#fefefe
| 474070 ||  || — || October 28, 2006 || Mount Lemmon || Mount Lemmon Survey || — || align=right data-sort-value="0.76" | 760 m || 
|-id=071 bgcolor=#E9E9E9
| 474071 ||  || — || August 22, 2004 || Kitt Peak || Spacewatch || — || align=right | 1.2 km || 
|-id=072 bgcolor=#E9E9E9
| 474072 ||  || — || February 2, 2006 || Kitt Peak || Spacewatch || AGN || align=right | 1.2 km || 
|-id=073 bgcolor=#E9E9E9
| 474073 ||  || — || April 25, 2003 || Kitt Peak || Spacewatch || — || align=right | 1.5 km || 
|-id=074 bgcolor=#E9E9E9
| 474074 ||  || — || August 30, 2005 || Kitt Peak || Spacewatch || — || align=right | 3.4 km || 
|-id=075 bgcolor=#fefefe
| 474075 ||  || — || September 21, 2003 || Kitt Peak || Spacewatch || — || align=right data-sort-value="0.85" | 850 m || 
|-id=076 bgcolor=#E9E9E9
| 474076 ||  || — || October 25, 2005 || Kitt Peak || Spacewatch || — || align=right data-sort-value="0.97" | 970 m || 
|-id=077 bgcolor=#E9E9E9
| 474077 ||  || — || July 14, 1999 || Socorro || LINEAR || JUN || align=right | 1.2 km || 
|-id=078 bgcolor=#fefefe
| 474078 ||  || — || December 10, 2006 || Kitt Peak || Spacewatch || H || align=right data-sort-value="0.68" | 680 m || 
|-id=079 bgcolor=#E9E9E9
| 474079 ||  || — || October 25, 2014 || Mount Lemmon || Mount Lemmon Survey || — || align=right | 2.8 km || 
|-id=080 bgcolor=#fefefe
| 474080 ||  || — || February 27, 2008 || Mount Lemmon || Mount Lemmon Survey || — || align=right | 1.8 km || 
|-id=081 bgcolor=#fefefe
| 474081 ||  || — || November 14, 2010 || Mount Lemmon || Mount Lemmon Survey || — || align=right data-sort-value="0.90" | 900 m || 
|-id=082 bgcolor=#E9E9E9
| 474082 ||  || — || November 18, 2009 || Kitt Peak || Spacewatch || EUN || align=right | 1.4 km || 
|-id=083 bgcolor=#E9E9E9
| 474083 ||  || — || March 15, 2007 || Mount Lemmon || Mount Lemmon Survey || RAF || align=right data-sort-value="0.98" | 980 m || 
|-id=084 bgcolor=#E9E9E9
| 474084 ||  || — || November 24, 2009 || Kitt Peak || Spacewatch || — || align=right | 2.5 km || 
|-id=085 bgcolor=#E9E9E9
| 474085 ||  || — || September 23, 2008 || Mount Lemmon || Mount Lemmon Survey || DOR || align=right | 2.2 km || 
|-id=086 bgcolor=#E9E9E9
| 474086 ||  || — || November 8, 2009 || Kitt Peak || Spacewatch || — || align=right | 2.6 km || 
|-id=087 bgcolor=#E9E9E9
| 474087 ||  || — || February 23, 2007 || Kitt Peak || Spacewatch || — || align=right | 1.5 km || 
|-id=088 bgcolor=#E9E9E9
| 474088 ||  || — || July 3, 2008 || Siding Spring || SSS || — || align=right | 2.0 km || 
|-id=089 bgcolor=#E9E9E9
| 474089 ||  || — || October 1, 2005 || Mount Lemmon || Mount Lemmon Survey || — || align=right | 1.1 km || 
|-id=090 bgcolor=#E9E9E9
| 474090 ||  || — || November 26, 2009 || Kitt Peak || Spacewatch || — || align=right | 1.2 km || 
|-id=091 bgcolor=#d6d6d6
| 474091 ||  || — || March 21, 2010 || Mount Lemmon || Mount Lemmon Survey || — || align=right | 2.7 km || 
|-id=092 bgcolor=#E9E9E9
| 474092 ||  || — || April 6, 2011 || Mount Lemmon || Mount Lemmon Survey || — || align=right | 2.5 km || 
|-id=093 bgcolor=#E9E9E9
| 474093 ||  || — || September 1, 2000 || Socorro || LINEAR || — || align=right | 1.1 km || 
|-id=094 bgcolor=#d6d6d6
| 474094 ||  || — || February 6, 2010 || WISE || WISE || — || align=right | 2.1 km || 
|-id=095 bgcolor=#E9E9E9
| 474095 ||  || — || September 21, 1995 || Kitt Peak || Spacewatch || — || align=right | 1.4 km || 
|-id=096 bgcolor=#E9E9E9
| 474096 ||  || — || May 22, 2003 || Kitt Peak || Spacewatch || — || align=right | 1.3 km || 
|-id=097 bgcolor=#d6d6d6
| 474097 ||  || — || February 10, 2010 || Kitt Peak || Spacewatch || — || align=right | 2.9 km || 
|-id=098 bgcolor=#d6d6d6
| 474098 ||  || — || July 4, 2010 || WISE || WISE || — || align=right | 4.1 km || 
|-id=099 bgcolor=#d6d6d6
| 474099 ||  || — || February 18, 2010 || Kitt Peak || Spacewatch || — || align=right | 2.2 km || 
|-id=100 bgcolor=#E9E9E9
| 474100 ||  || — || June 16, 2012 || Mount Lemmon || Mount Lemmon Survey || EUN || align=right | 1.0 km || 
|}

474101–474200 

|-bgcolor=#fefefe
| 474101 ||  || — || August 30, 1998 || Kitt Peak || Spacewatch || V || align=right data-sort-value="0.67" | 670 m || 
|-id=102 bgcolor=#d6d6d6
| 474102 ||  || — || September 26, 2006 || Catalina || CSS || — || align=right | 4.2 km || 
|-id=103 bgcolor=#fefefe
| 474103 ||  || — || April 1, 2008 || Mount Lemmon || Mount Lemmon Survey || — || align=right data-sort-value="0.76" | 760 m || 
|-id=104 bgcolor=#d6d6d6
| 474104 ||  || — || August 2, 2010 || WISE || WISE || — || align=right | 2.9 km || 
|-id=105 bgcolor=#fefefe
| 474105 ||  || — || July 22, 2010 || WISE || WISE || — || align=right | 2.1 km || 
|-id=106 bgcolor=#E9E9E9
| 474106 ||  || — || November 3, 2008 || Mount Lemmon || Mount Lemmon Survey || — || align=right | 2.6 km || 
|-id=107 bgcolor=#d6d6d6
| 474107 ||  || — || July 5, 2005 || Mount Lemmon || Mount Lemmon Survey || — || align=right | 3.2 km || 
|-id=108 bgcolor=#d6d6d6
| 474108 ||  || — || February 6, 2010 || WISE || WISE || — || align=right | 3.6 km || 
|-id=109 bgcolor=#fefefe
| 474109 ||  || — || January 17, 1998 || Caussols || ODAS || V || align=right data-sort-value="0.68" | 680 m || 
|-id=110 bgcolor=#d6d6d6
| 474110 ||  || — || January 26, 2010 || WISE || WISE || — || align=right | 3.6 km || 
|-id=111 bgcolor=#E9E9E9
| 474111 ||  || — || March 13, 2007 || Mount Lemmon || Mount Lemmon Survey || — || align=right | 1.0 km || 
|-id=112 bgcolor=#fefefe
| 474112 ||  || — || May 22, 2006 || Kitt Peak || Spacewatch || — || align=right data-sort-value="0.71" | 710 m || 
|-id=113 bgcolor=#E9E9E9
| 474113 ||  || — || November 3, 1999 || Kitt Peak || Spacewatch || — || align=right | 2.8 km || 
|-id=114 bgcolor=#d6d6d6
| 474114 ||  || — || November 21, 2008 || Mount Lemmon || Mount Lemmon Survey || — || align=right | 4.5 km || 
|-id=115 bgcolor=#d6d6d6
| 474115 ||  || — || January 16, 2010 || WISE || WISE || — || align=right | 2.8 km || 
|-id=116 bgcolor=#d6d6d6
| 474116 ||  || — || May 24, 2000 || Kitt Peak || Spacewatch || — || align=right | 3.3 km || 
|-id=117 bgcolor=#d6d6d6
| 474117 ||  || — || March 1, 2009 || Kitt Peak || Spacewatch || — || align=right | 3.7 km || 
|-id=118 bgcolor=#E9E9E9
| 474118 ||  || — || May 9, 2007 || Kitt Peak || Spacewatch || — || align=right | 2.1 km || 
|-id=119 bgcolor=#E9E9E9
| 474119 ||  || — || October 9, 2008 || Mount Lemmon || Mount Lemmon Survey || EUN || align=right | 1.4 km || 
|-id=120 bgcolor=#d6d6d6
| 474120 ||  || — || September 24, 1960 || Palomar || PLS || — || align=right | 2.8 km || 
|-id=121 bgcolor=#E9E9E9
| 474121 ||  || — || October 10, 1993 || Kitt Peak || Spacewatch || — || align=right | 1.9 km || 
|-id=122 bgcolor=#E9E9E9
| 474122 ||  || — || September 5, 1994 || La Silla || E. W. Elst || — || align=right | 1.5 km || 
|-id=123 bgcolor=#E9E9E9
| 474123 ||  || — || January 31, 1995 || Kitt Peak || Spacewatch || — || align=right | 1.9 km || 
|-id=124 bgcolor=#E9E9E9
| 474124 ||  || — || June 24, 1995 || Kitt Peak || Spacewatch || — || align=right data-sort-value="0.86" | 860 m || 
|-id=125 bgcolor=#d6d6d6
| 474125 ||  || — || August 27, 1995 || Kitt Peak || Spacewatch || — || align=right | 2.4 km || 
|-id=126 bgcolor=#d6d6d6
| 474126 ||  || — || August 25, 1995 || Kitt Peak || Spacewatch || EOS || align=right | 1.3 km || 
|-id=127 bgcolor=#d6d6d6
| 474127 ||  || — || August 25, 1995 || Kitt Peak || Spacewatch || EOS || align=right | 1.8 km || 
|-id=128 bgcolor=#E9E9E9
| 474128 ||  || — || September 20, 1995 || Kitt Peak || Spacewatch || (5) || align=right data-sort-value="0.81" | 810 m || 
|-id=129 bgcolor=#FA8072
| 474129 ||  || — || September 19, 1995 || Kitt Peak || Spacewatch || — || align=right data-sort-value="0.85" | 850 m || 
|-id=130 bgcolor=#d6d6d6
| 474130 ||  || — || September 19, 1995 || Kitt Peak || Spacewatch || — || align=right | 2.6 km || 
|-id=131 bgcolor=#fefefe
| 474131 ||  || — || September 20, 1995 || Kitt Peak || Spacewatch || — || align=right data-sort-value="0.54" | 540 m || 
|-id=132 bgcolor=#E9E9E9
| 474132 ||  || — || September 20, 1995 || Kitt Peak || Spacewatch || — || align=right | 1.2 km || 
|-id=133 bgcolor=#fefefe
| 474133 ||  || — || September 20, 1995 || Kitt Peak || Spacewatch || critical || align=right data-sort-value="0.57" | 570 m || 
|-id=134 bgcolor=#d6d6d6
| 474134 ||  || — || September 20, 1995 || Kitt Peak || Spacewatch || EOS || align=right | 1.7 km || 
|-id=135 bgcolor=#E9E9E9
| 474135 ||  || — || September 30, 1995 || Kitt Peak || Spacewatch || — || align=right | 1.1 km || 
|-id=136 bgcolor=#E9E9E9
| 474136 ||  || — || September 19, 1995 || Kitt Peak || Spacewatch || — || align=right | 1.1 km || 
|-id=137 bgcolor=#fefefe
| 474137 ||  || — || October 1, 1995 || Kitt Peak || Spacewatch || — || align=right data-sort-value="0.50" | 500 m || 
|-id=138 bgcolor=#d6d6d6
| 474138 ||  || — || October 2, 1995 || Kitt Peak || Spacewatch || — || align=right | 2.0 km || 
|-id=139 bgcolor=#E9E9E9
| 474139 ||  || — || September 22, 1995 || Kitt Peak || Spacewatch || RAF || align=right data-sort-value="0.78" | 780 m || 
|-id=140 bgcolor=#d6d6d6
| 474140 ||  || — || October 1, 1995 || Kitt Peak || Spacewatch || — || align=right | 2.7 km || 
|-id=141 bgcolor=#d6d6d6
| 474141 ||  || — || December 14, 1995 || Kitt Peak || Spacewatch || — || align=right | 2.0 km || 
|-id=142 bgcolor=#fefefe
| 474142 ||  || — || December 12, 1996 || Kitt Peak || Spacewatch || — || align=right data-sort-value="0.68" | 680 m || 
|-id=143 bgcolor=#FA8072
| 474143 ||  || — || June 29, 1997 || Kitt Peak || Spacewatch || H || align=right data-sort-value="0.87" | 870 m || 
|-id=144 bgcolor=#fefefe
| 474144 ||  || — || October 18, 1997 || Kleť || Kleť Obs. || — || align=right | 2.1 km || 
|-id=145 bgcolor=#fefefe
| 474145 ||  || — || September 13, 1998 || Kitt Peak || Spacewatch || — || align=right data-sort-value="0.64" | 640 m || 
|-id=146 bgcolor=#fefefe
| 474146 ||  || — || September 14, 1998 || Kitt Peak || Spacewatch || NYScritical || align=right data-sort-value="0.50" | 500 m || 
|-id=147 bgcolor=#fefefe
| 474147 ||  || — || September 14, 1998 || Kitt Peak || Spacewatch || NYS || align=right data-sort-value="0.59" | 590 m || 
|-id=148 bgcolor=#E9E9E9
| 474148 ||  || — || September 16, 1998 || Kitt Peak || Spacewatch || — || align=right | 1.2 km || 
|-id=149 bgcolor=#fefefe
| 474149 ||  || — || September 17, 1998 || Kitt Peak || Spacewatch || — || align=right data-sort-value="0.73" | 730 m || 
|-id=150 bgcolor=#E9E9E9
| 474150 ||  || — || September 26, 1998 || Socorro || LINEAR || — || align=right | 2.6 km || 
|-id=151 bgcolor=#E9E9E9
| 474151 ||  || — || September 26, 1998 || Socorro || LINEAR || — || align=right | 1.8 km || 
|-id=152 bgcolor=#E9E9E9
| 474152 ||  || — || September 19, 1998 || Apache Point || SDSS || — || align=right | 1.4 km || 
|-id=153 bgcolor=#E9E9E9
| 474153 ||  || — || October 13, 1998 || Kitt Peak || Spacewatch || — || align=right | 2.1 km || 
|-id=154 bgcolor=#fefefe
| 474154 ||  || — || October 24, 1998 || Kitt Peak || Spacewatch || — || align=right data-sort-value="0.74" | 740 m || 
|-id=155 bgcolor=#fefefe
| 474155 ||  || — || November 19, 1998 || Kitt Peak || Spacewatch || — || align=right data-sort-value="0.65" | 650 m || 
|-id=156 bgcolor=#FA8072
| 474156 ||  || — || December 12, 1998 || Socorro || LINEAR || — || align=right data-sort-value="0.62" | 620 m || 
|-id=157 bgcolor=#E9E9E9
| 474157 ||  || — || December 13, 1998 || Kitt Peak || Spacewatch || — || align=right | 1.9 km || 
|-id=158 bgcolor=#FFC2E0
| 474158 ||  || — || March 16, 1999 || Socorro || LINEAR || APOPHAcritical || align=right data-sort-value="0.26" | 260 m || 
|-id=159 bgcolor=#d6d6d6
| 474159 ||  || — || September 3, 1999 || Prescott || P. G. Comba || — || align=right | 3.0 km || 
|-id=160 bgcolor=#d6d6d6
| 474160 ||  || — || September 3, 1999 || Kitt Peak || Spacewatch || — || align=right | 3.1 km || 
|-id=161 bgcolor=#E9E9E9
| 474161 ||  || — || September 5, 1999 || Catalina || CSS || — || align=right | 1.9 km || 
|-id=162 bgcolor=#E9E9E9
| 474162 ||  || — || September 5, 1999 || Anderson Mesa || LONEOS || — || align=right | 1.1 km || 
|-id=163 bgcolor=#FFC2E0
| 474163 ||  || — || September 29, 1999 || Catalina || CSS || APOPHAfastcritical || align=right data-sort-value="0.23" | 230 m || 
|-id=164 bgcolor=#E9E9E9
| 474164 ||  || — || September 30, 1999 || Kitt Peak || Spacewatch || — || align=right | 1.3 km || 
|-id=165 bgcolor=#E9E9E9
| 474165 ||  || — || October 7, 1999 || Kitt Peak || Spacewatch || — || align=right | 1.1 km || 
|-id=166 bgcolor=#fefefe
| 474166 ||  || — || October 8, 1999 || Kitt Peak || Spacewatch || — || align=right data-sort-value="0.62" | 620 m || 
|-id=167 bgcolor=#E9E9E9
| 474167 ||  || — || October 2, 1999 || Kitt Peak || Spacewatch || EUN || align=right | 1.3 km || 
|-id=168 bgcolor=#d6d6d6
| 474168 ||  || — || October 11, 1999 || Kitt Peak || Spacewatch || — || align=right | 3.3 km || 
|-id=169 bgcolor=#E9E9E9
| 474169 ||  || — || October 15, 1999 || Kitt Peak || Spacewatch || — || align=right | 1.2 km || 
|-id=170 bgcolor=#E9E9E9
| 474170 ||  || — || October 10, 1999 || Socorro || LINEAR || — || align=right | 1.5 km || 
|-id=171 bgcolor=#FA8072
| 474171 ||  || — || October 12, 1999 || Socorro || LINEAR || — || align=right | 1.4 km || 
|-id=172 bgcolor=#fefefe
| 474172 ||  || — || October 3, 1999 || Kitt Peak || Spacewatch || — || align=right data-sort-value="0.57" | 570 m || 
|-id=173 bgcolor=#d6d6d6
| 474173 ||  || — || October 14, 1999 || Kitt Peak || Spacewatch || THB || align=right | 2.4 km || 
|-id=174 bgcolor=#d6d6d6
| 474174 ||  || — || October 2, 1999 || Kitt Peak || Spacewatch || — || align=right | 2.8 km || 
|-id=175 bgcolor=#d6d6d6
| 474175 ||  || — || October 4, 1999 || Kitt Peak || Spacewatch || — || align=right | 2.5 km || 
|-id=176 bgcolor=#fefefe
| 474176 ||  || — || October 11, 1999 || Kitt Peak || Spacewatch || — || align=right data-sort-value="0.57" | 570 m || 
|-id=177 bgcolor=#E9E9E9
| 474177 ||  || — || October 12, 1999 || Kitt Peak || Spacewatch || — || align=right | 1.4 km || 
|-id=178 bgcolor=#fefefe
| 474178 ||  || — || October 1, 1999 || Catalina || CSS || — || align=right data-sort-value="0.77" | 770 m || 
|-id=179 bgcolor=#FFC2E0
| 474179 ||  || — || November 6, 1999 || Socorro || LINEAR || APO || align=right data-sort-value="0.55" | 550 m || 
|-id=180 bgcolor=#d6d6d6
| 474180 ||  || — || November 5, 1999 || Kitt Peak || Spacewatch || — || align=right | 3.0 km || 
|-id=181 bgcolor=#FA8072
| 474181 ||  || — || November 4, 1999 || Socorro || LINEAR || — || align=right | 1.3 km || 
|-id=182 bgcolor=#d6d6d6
| 474182 ||  || — || November 9, 1999 || Kitt Peak || Spacewatch || — || align=right | 2.8 km || 
|-id=183 bgcolor=#E9E9E9
| 474183 ||  || — || October 12, 1999 || Socorro || LINEAR || — || align=right | 1.5 km || 
|-id=184 bgcolor=#E9E9E9
| 474184 ||  || — || November 3, 1999 || Socorro || LINEAR || JUN || align=right data-sort-value="0.92" | 920 m || 
|-id=185 bgcolor=#fefefe
| 474185 ||  || — || November 11, 1999 || Kitt Peak || Spacewatch || — || align=right data-sort-value="0.60" | 600 m || 
|-id=186 bgcolor=#E9E9E9
| 474186 ||  || — || October 10, 1999 || Socorro || LINEAR || — || align=right | 1.7 km || 
|-id=187 bgcolor=#E9E9E9
| 474187 ||  || — || November 5, 1999 || Kitt Peak || Spacewatch || — || align=right | 1.3 km || 
|-id=188 bgcolor=#E9E9E9
| 474188 ||  || — || November 1, 1999 || Catalina || CSS || — || align=right | 1.3 km || 
|-id=189 bgcolor=#FA8072
| 474189 ||  || — || December 5, 1999 || Socorro || LINEAR || — || align=right | 2.5 km || 
|-id=190 bgcolor=#FA8072
| 474190 ||  || — || December 6, 1999 || Socorro || LINEAR || — || align=right | 1.2 km || 
|-id=191 bgcolor=#E9E9E9
| 474191 ||  || — || December 4, 1999 || Catalina || CSS || — || align=right | 1.6 km || 
|-id=192 bgcolor=#E9E9E9
| 474192 ||  || — || December 29, 1999 || Mauna Kea || C. Veillet || — || align=right data-sort-value="0.98" | 980 m || 
|-id=193 bgcolor=#E9E9E9
| 474193 ||  || — || December 27, 1999 || Kitt Peak || Spacewatch || — || align=right | 1.5 km || 
|-id=194 bgcolor=#E9E9E9
| 474194 ||  || — || December 14, 1999 || Socorro || LINEAR || — || align=right | 1.7 km || 
|-id=195 bgcolor=#E9E9E9
| 474195 ||  || — || January 8, 2000 || Kitt Peak || Spacewatch || — || align=right | 1.8 km || 
|-id=196 bgcolor=#E9E9E9
| 474196 ||  || — || January 5, 2000 || Kitt Peak || Spacewatch || — || align=right | 1.1 km || 
|-id=197 bgcolor=#fefefe
| 474197 ||  || — || January 26, 2000 || Kitt Peak || Spacewatch || — || align=right data-sort-value="0.51" | 510 m || 
|-id=198 bgcolor=#E9E9E9
| 474198 ||  || — || February 3, 2000 || Socorro || LINEAR || JUN || align=right | 1.1 km || 
|-id=199 bgcolor=#fefefe
| 474199 ||  || — || February 6, 2000 || Kitt Peak || Spacewatch || V || align=right data-sort-value="0.61" | 610 m || 
|-id=200 bgcolor=#E9E9E9
| 474200 ||  || — || February 29, 2000 || Socorro || LINEAR || — || align=right | 2.8 km || 
|}

474201–474300 

|-bgcolor=#fefefe
| 474201 ||  || — || April 28, 2000 || Socorro || LINEAR || — || align=right | 1.6 km || 
|-id=202 bgcolor=#FA8072
| 474202 ||  || — || May 27, 2000 || Socorro || LINEAR || — || align=right data-sort-value="0.71" | 710 m || 
|-id=203 bgcolor=#FA8072
| 474203 ||  || — || August 29, 2000 || Socorro || LINEAR || — || align=right data-sort-value="0.65" | 650 m || 
|-id=204 bgcolor=#FA8072
| 474204 ||  || — || August 29, 2000 || Socorro || LINEAR || — || align=right data-sort-value="0.61" | 610 m || 
|-id=205 bgcolor=#FA8072
| 474205 ||  || — || September 24, 2000 || Socorro || LINEAR || — || align=right data-sort-value="0.59" | 590 m || 
|-id=206 bgcolor=#d6d6d6
| 474206 ||  || — || September 23, 2000 || Socorro || LINEAR || — || align=right | 2.4 km || 
|-id=207 bgcolor=#d6d6d6
| 474207 ||  || — || September 27, 2000 || Kitt Peak || Spacewatch || THM || align=right | 1.9 km || 
|-id=208 bgcolor=#fefefe
| 474208 ||  || — || September 28, 2000 || Socorro || LINEAR || — || align=right data-sort-value="0.62" | 620 m || 
|-id=209 bgcolor=#d6d6d6
| 474209 ||  || — || September 28, 2000 || Socorro || LINEAR || — || align=right | 2.8 km || 
|-id=210 bgcolor=#d6d6d6
| 474210 ||  || — || September 25, 2000 || Socorro || LINEAR || — || align=right | 3.4 km || 
|-id=211 bgcolor=#E9E9E9
| 474211 ||  || — || September 30, 2000 || Kitt Peak || Spacewatch || — || align=right data-sort-value="0.85" | 850 m || 
|-id=212 bgcolor=#E9E9E9
| 474212 ||  || — || September 29, 2000 || Mauna Kea || D. J. Tholen, R. J. Whiteley || — || align=right data-sort-value="0.60" | 600 m || 
|-id=213 bgcolor=#d6d6d6
| 474213 ||  || — || October 1, 2000 || Socorro || LINEAR || — || align=right | 2.1 km || 
|-id=214 bgcolor=#d6d6d6
| 474214 ||  || — || September 26, 2000 || Socorro || LINEAR || — || align=right | 3.3 km || 
|-id=215 bgcolor=#fefefe
| 474215 ||  || — || October 2, 2000 || Socorro || LINEAR || H || align=right data-sort-value="0.99" | 990 m || 
|-id=216 bgcolor=#d6d6d6
| 474216 ||  || — || September 27, 2000 || Socorro || LINEAR || — || align=right | 4.1 km || 
|-id=217 bgcolor=#fefefe
| 474217 ||  || — || October 25, 2000 || Socorro || LINEAR || — || align=right | 1.2 km || 
|-id=218 bgcolor=#d6d6d6
| 474218 ||  || — || October 25, 2000 || Socorro || LINEAR || — || align=right | 3.7 km || 
|-id=219 bgcolor=#E9E9E9
| 474219 ||  || — || November 3, 2000 || Socorro || LINEAR || — || align=right data-sort-value="0.89" | 890 m || 
|-id=220 bgcolor=#d6d6d6
| 474220 ||  || — || November 20, 2000 || Socorro || LINEAR || — || align=right | 3.9 km || 
|-id=221 bgcolor=#d6d6d6
| 474221 ||  || — || January 5, 2001 || Socorro || LINEAR || — || align=right | 2.8 km || 
|-id=222 bgcolor=#d6d6d6
| 474222 ||  || — || January 19, 2001 || Socorro || LINEAR || — || align=right | 3.3 km || 
|-id=223 bgcolor=#FFC2E0
| 474223 ||  || — || February 12, 2001 || Anderson Mesa || LONEOS || AMO || align=right data-sort-value="0.55" | 550 m || 
|-id=224 bgcolor=#E9E9E9
| 474224 ||  || — || February 1, 2001 || Kitt Peak || Spacewatch || — || align=right | 1.5 km || 
|-id=225 bgcolor=#FA8072
| 474225 ||  || — || February 16, 2001 || Socorro || LINEAR || — || align=right | 1.3 km || 
|-id=226 bgcolor=#fefefe
| 474226 ||  || — || January 18, 2001 || Socorro || LINEAR || — || align=right | 1.1 km || 
|-id=227 bgcolor=#E9E9E9
| 474227 ||  || — || December 28, 2000 || Socorro || LINEAR || — || align=right | 2.6 km || 
|-id=228 bgcolor=#E9E9E9
| 474228 ||  || — || February 26, 2001 || Cima Ekar || ADAS || — || align=right | 2.3 km || 
|-id=229 bgcolor=#fefefe
| 474229 ||  || — || January 19, 2001 || Kitt Peak || Spacewatch || — || align=right data-sort-value="0.94" | 940 m || 
|-id=230 bgcolor=#fefefe
| 474230 ||  || — || March 21, 2001 || Kitt Peak || SKADS || — || align=right data-sort-value="0.67" | 670 m || 
|-id=231 bgcolor=#FFC2E0
| 474231 ||  || — || April 21, 2001 || Socorro || LINEAR || APOPHA || align=right data-sort-value="0.36" | 360 m || 
|-id=232 bgcolor=#fefefe
| 474232 ||  || — || August 14, 2001 || Palomar || NEAT || — || align=right data-sort-value="0.72" | 720 m || 
|-id=233 bgcolor=#fefefe
| 474233 ||  || — || August 19, 2001 || Socorro || LINEAR || — || align=right data-sort-value="0.91" | 910 m || 
|-id=234 bgcolor=#fefefe
| 474234 ||  || — || August 19, 2001 || Socorro || LINEAR || — || align=right data-sort-value="0.91" | 910 m || 
|-id=235 bgcolor=#fefefe
| 474235 ||  || — || August 23, 2001 || Anderson Mesa || LONEOS || NYS || align=right data-sort-value="0.63" | 630 m || 
|-id=236 bgcolor=#fefefe
| 474236 ||  || — || August 20, 2001 || Cerro Tololo || M. W. Buie || — || align=right data-sort-value="0.73" | 730 m || 
|-id=237 bgcolor=#fefefe
| 474237 ||  || — || September 10, 2001 || Socorro || LINEAR || — || align=right data-sort-value="0.65" | 650 m || 
|-id=238 bgcolor=#FFC2E0
| 474238 ||  || — || September 11, 2001 || Anderson Mesa || LONEOS || ATEcritical || align=right data-sort-value="0.18" | 180 m || 
|-id=239 bgcolor=#fefefe
| 474239 ||  || — || September 7, 2001 || Socorro || LINEAR || — || align=right data-sort-value="0.77" | 770 m || 
|-id=240 bgcolor=#fefefe
| 474240 ||  || — || September 11, 2001 || Anderson Mesa || LONEOS || — || align=right data-sort-value="0.90" | 900 m || 
|-id=241 bgcolor=#fefefe
| 474241 ||  || — || September 12, 2001 || Socorro || LINEAR || MAS || align=right data-sort-value="0.57" | 570 m || 
|-id=242 bgcolor=#fefefe
| 474242 ||  || — || September 12, 2001 || Socorro || LINEAR || V || align=right data-sort-value="0.71" | 710 m || 
|-id=243 bgcolor=#fefefe
| 474243 ||  || — || September 16, 2001 || Socorro || LINEAR || H || align=right data-sort-value="0.75" | 750 m || 
|-id=244 bgcolor=#fefefe
| 474244 ||  || — || September 16, 2001 || Socorro || LINEAR || — || align=right data-sort-value="0.76" | 760 m || 
|-id=245 bgcolor=#fefefe
| 474245 ||  || — || September 16, 2001 || Socorro || LINEAR || NYScritical || align=right data-sort-value="0.63" | 630 m || 
|-id=246 bgcolor=#fefefe
| 474246 ||  || — || September 16, 2001 || Socorro || LINEAR || — || align=right data-sort-value="0.71" | 710 m || 
|-id=247 bgcolor=#fefefe
| 474247 ||  || — || September 17, 2001 || Socorro || LINEAR || — || align=right | 1.0 km || 
|-id=248 bgcolor=#d6d6d6
| 474248 ||  || — || September 12, 2001 || Kitt Peak || Spacewatch || — || align=right | 2.5 km || 
|-id=249 bgcolor=#FA8072
| 474249 ||  || — || September 20, 2001 || Desert Eagle || W. K. Y. Yeung || H || align=right data-sort-value="0.57" | 570 m || 
|-id=250 bgcolor=#fefefe
| 474250 ||  || — || September 16, 2001 || Socorro || LINEAR || (5026) || align=right data-sort-value="0.83" | 830 m || 
|-id=251 bgcolor=#fefefe
| 474251 ||  || — || August 27, 2001 || Anderson Mesa || LONEOS || — || align=right data-sort-value="0.89" | 890 m || 
|-id=252 bgcolor=#fefefe
| 474252 ||  || — || September 19, 2001 || Socorro || LINEAR || critical || align=right data-sort-value="0.65" | 650 m || 
|-id=253 bgcolor=#fefefe
| 474253 ||  || — || September 19, 2001 || Socorro || LINEAR || NYS || align=right data-sort-value="0.59" | 590 m || 
|-id=254 bgcolor=#fefefe
| 474254 ||  || — || September 19, 2001 || Socorro || LINEAR || — || align=right data-sort-value="0.72" | 720 m || 
|-id=255 bgcolor=#fefefe
| 474255 ||  || — || September 19, 2001 || Socorro || LINEAR || — || align=right data-sort-value="0.96" | 960 m || 
|-id=256 bgcolor=#fefefe
| 474256 ||  || — || September 19, 2001 || Socorro || LINEAR || — || align=right data-sort-value="0.99" | 990 m || 
|-id=257 bgcolor=#fefefe
| 474257 ||  || — || September 21, 2001 || Kitt Peak || Spacewatch || — || align=right data-sort-value="0.77" | 770 m || 
|-id=258 bgcolor=#fefefe
| 474258 ||  || — || September 20, 2001 || Socorro || LINEAR || — || align=right data-sort-value="0.74" | 740 m || 
|-id=259 bgcolor=#fefefe
| 474259 ||  || — || September 21, 2001 || Socorro || LINEAR || — || align=right data-sort-value="0.74" | 740 m || 
|-id=260 bgcolor=#d6d6d6
| 474260 ||  || — || September 23, 2001 || Socorro || LINEAR || — || align=right | 1.9 km || 
|-id=261 bgcolor=#fefefe
| 474261 ||  || — || September 18, 2001 || Anderson Mesa || LONEOS || — || align=right data-sort-value="0.68" | 680 m || 
|-id=262 bgcolor=#fefefe
| 474262 ||  || — || September 19, 2001 || Socorro || LINEAR || — || align=right data-sort-value="0.59" | 590 m || 
|-id=263 bgcolor=#FA8072
| 474263 ||  || — || October 15, 2001 || Socorro || LINEAR || — || align=right | 1.2 km || 
|-id=264 bgcolor=#fefefe
| 474264 ||  || — || October 14, 2001 || Socorro || LINEAR || — || align=right data-sort-value="0.70" | 700 m || 
|-id=265 bgcolor=#d6d6d6
| 474265 ||  || — || October 14, 2001 || Socorro || LINEAR || — || align=right | 2.8 km || 
|-id=266 bgcolor=#d6d6d6
| 474266 ||  || — || October 15, 2001 || Socorro || LINEAR || — || align=right | 2.3 km || 
|-id=267 bgcolor=#d6d6d6
| 474267 ||  || — || October 14, 2001 || Kitt Peak || Spacewatch || — || align=right | 1.9 km || 
|-id=268 bgcolor=#fefefe
| 474268 ||  || — || October 14, 2001 || Kitt Peak || Spacewatch || — || align=right data-sort-value="0.74" | 740 m || 
|-id=269 bgcolor=#d6d6d6
| 474269 ||  || — || October 15, 2001 || Kitt Peak || Spacewatch || — || align=right | 2.9 km || 
|-id=270 bgcolor=#d6d6d6
| 474270 ||  || — || October 14, 2001 || Socorro || LINEAR || — || align=right | 2.2 km || 
|-id=271 bgcolor=#d6d6d6
| 474271 ||  || — || October 14, 2001 || Socorro || LINEAR || — || align=right | 1.8 km || 
|-id=272 bgcolor=#fefefe
| 474272 ||  || — || October 14, 2001 || Socorro || LINEAR || — || align=right data-sort-value="0.87" | 870 m || 
|-id=273 bgcolor=#fefefe
| 474273 ||  || — || October 15, 2001 || Socorro || LINEAR || — || align=right data-sort-value="0.68" | 680 m || 
|-id=274 bgcolor=#fefefe
| 474274 ||  || — || October 11, 2001 || Palomar || NEAT || MAS || align=right data-sort-value="0.54" | 540 m || 
|-id=275 bgcolor=#d6d6d6
| 474275 ||  || — || October 14, 2001 || Apache Point || SDSS || — || align=right | 1.3 km || 
|-id=276 bgcolor=#d6d6d6
| 474276 ||  || — || October 7, 2001 || Palomar || NEAT || — || align=right | 2.2 km || 
|-id=277 bgcolor=#FA8072
| 474277 ||  || — || October 17, 2001 || Socorro || LINEAR || — || align=right | 1.9 km || 
|-id=278 bgcolor=#FA8072
| 474278 ||  || — || October 26, 2001 || Haleakala || NEAT || — || align=right data-sort-value="0.53" | 530 m || 
|-id=279 bgcolor=#fefefe
| 474279 ||  || — || October 16, 2001 || Socorro || LINEAR || MASfast || align=right data-sort-value="0.84" | 840 m || 
|-id=280 bgcolor=#fefefe
| 474280 ||  || — || October 17, 2001 || Socorro || LINEAR || NYS || align=right data-sort-value="0.74" | 740 m || 
|-id=281 bgcolor=#fefefe
| 474281 ||  || — || October 17, 2001 || Socorro || LINEAR || — || align=right data-sort-value="0.99" | 990 m || 
|-id=282 bgcolor=#fefefe
| 474282 ||  || — || October 17, 2001 || Socorro || LINEAR || NYS || align=right data-sort-value="0.60" | 600 m || 
|-id=283 bgcolor=#fefefe
| 474283 ||  || — || October 20, 2001 || Socorro || LINEAR || NYS || align=right data-sort-value="0.64" | 640 m || 
|-id=284 bgcolor=#fefefe
| 474284 ||  || — || October 16, 2001 || Palomar || NEAT || — || align=right data-sort-value="0.70" | 700 m || 
|-id=285 bgcolor=#fefefe
| 474285 ||  || — || October 18, 2001 || Palomar || NEAT || — || align=right data-sort-value="0.71" | 710 m || 
|-id=286 bgcolor=#fefefe
| 474286 ||  || — || November 9, 2001 || Palomar || NEAT || — || align=right data-sort-value="0.91" | 910 m || 
|-id=287 bgcolor=#fefefe
| 474287 ||  || — || November 17, 2001 || Socorro || LINEAR || — || align=right data-sort-value="0.79" | 790 m || 
|-id=288 bgcolor=#fefefe
| 474288 ||  || — || November 19, 2001 || Socorro || LINEAR || NYS || align=right data-sort-value="0.63" | 630 m || 
|-id=289 bgcolor=#d6d6d6
| 474289 ||  || — || November 20, 2001 || Socorro || LINEAR || EOS || align=right | 2.0 km || 
|-id=290 bgcolor=#fefefe
| 474290 ||  || — || November 20, 2001 || Socorro || LINEAR || MAS || align=right data-sort-value="0.73" | 730 m || 
|-id=291 bgcolor=#d6d6d6
| 474291 ||  || — || November 19, 2001 || Socorro || LINEAR || — || align=right | 2.9 km || 
|-id=292 bgcolor=#d6d6d6
| 474292 ||  || — || November 16, 2001 || Kitt Peak || Spacewatch || — || align=right | 1.5 km || 
|-id=293 bgcolor=#fefefe
| 474293 ||  || — || November 17, 2001 || Kitt Peak || Spacewatch || — || align=right data-sort-value="0.68" | 680 m || 
|-id=294 bgcolor=#FA8072
| 474294 ||  || — || December 7, 2001 || Socorro || LINEAR || H || align=right data-sort-value="0.55" | 550 m || 
|-id=295 bgcolor=#FA8072
| 474295 ||  || — || December 11, 2001 || Socorro || LINEAR || — || align=right data-sort-value="0.73" | 730 m || 
|-id=296 bgcolor=#d6d6d6
| 474296 ||  || — || December 10, 2001 || Socorro || LINEAR || — || align=right | 4.2 km || 
|-id=297 bgcolor=#fefefe
| 474297 ||  || — || November 20, 2001 || Socorro || LINEAR || — || align=right data-sort-value="0.80" | 800 m || 
|-id=298 bgcolor=#fefefe
| 474298 ||  || — || December 14, 2001 || Socorro || LINEAR || MAS || align=right data-sort-value="0.82" | 820 m || 
|-id=299 bgcolor=#fefefe
| 474299 ||  || — || December 14, 2001 || Socorro || LINEAR || — || align=right data-sort-value="0.97" | 970 m || 
|-id=300 bgcolor=#fefefe
| 474300 ||  || — || November 20, 2001 || Socorro || LINEAR || — || align=right data-sort-value="0.76" | 760 m || 
|}

474301–474400 

|-bgcolor=#d6d6d6
| 474301 ||  || — || December 14, 2001 || Socorro || LINEAR || — || align=right | 2.1 km || 
|-id=302 bgcolor=#fefefe
| 474302 ||  || — || December 15, 2001 || Socorro || LINEAR || — || align=right data-sort-value="0.70" | 700 m || 
|-id=303 bgcolor=#d6d6d6
| 474303 ||  || — || December 14, 2001 || Kitt Peak || Spacewatch || EOS || align=right | 2.1 km || 
|-id=304 bgcolor=#d6d6d6
| 474304 ||  || — || December 22, 1995 || Kitt Peak || Spacewatch || — || align=right | 3.2 km || 
|-id=305 bgcolor=#d6d6d6
| 474305 ||  || — || December 14, 2001 || Socorro || LINEAR || EOS || align=right | 2.6 km || 
|-id=306 bgcolor=#d6d6d6
| 474306 ||  || — || November 20, 2001 || Socorro || LINEAR || SHU3:2 || align=right | 5.9 km || 
|-id=307 bgcolor=#d6d6d6
| 474307 ||  || — || December 18, 2001 || Socorro || LINEAR || — || align=right | 2.7 km || 
|-id=308 bgcolor=#d6d6d6
| 474308 ||  || — || December 17, 2001 || Socorro || LINEAR || — || align=right | 3.1 km || 
|-id=309 bgcolor=#d6d6d6
| 474309 ||  || — || January 8, 2002 || Kitt Peak || Spacewatch || — || align=right | 3.9 km || 
|-id=310 bgcolor=#d6d6d6
| 474310 ||  || — || January 9, 2002 || Socorro || LINEAR || — || align=right | 2.1 km || 
|-id=311 bgcolor=#d6d6d6
| 474311 ||  || — || January 11, 2002 || Socorro || LINEAR || — || align=right | 2.8 km || 
|-id=312 bgcolor=#fefefe
| 474312 ||  || — || January 13, 2002 || Socorro || LINEAR || — || align=right | 1.0 km || 
|-id=313 bgcolor=#d6d6d6
| 474313 ||  || — || January 13, 2002 || Socorro || LINEAR || — || align=right | 3.2 km || 
|-id=314 bgcolor=#d6d6d6
| 474314 ||  || — || January 14, 2002 || Socorro || LINEAR || — || align=right | 3.1 km || 
|-id=315 bgcolor=#d6d6d6
| 474315 ||  || — || January 14, 2002 || Socorro || LINEAR || — || align=right | 2.6 km || 
|-id=316 bgcolor=#d6d6d6
| 474316 ||  || — || January 21, 2002 || Kitt Peak || Spacewatch || — || align=right | 3.0 km || 
|-id=317 bgcolor=#d6d6d6
| 474317 ||  || — || January 13, 2002 || Kitt Peak || Spacewatch || — || align=right | 3.9 km || 
|-id=318 bgcolor=#E9E9E9
| 474318 ||  || — || February 7, 2002 || Socorro || LINEAR || — || align=right | 2.0 km || 
|-id=319 bgcolor=#d6d6d6
| 474319 ||  || — || January 22, 2002 || Kitt Peak || Spacewatch || — || align=right | 2.5 km || 
|-id=320 bgcolor=#d6d6d6
| 474320 ||  || — || February 7, 2002 || Kitt Peak || Spacewatch || — || align=right | 3.1 km || 
|-id=321 bgcolor=#d6d6d6
| 474321 ||  || — || February 10, 2002 || Socorro || LINEAR || — || align=right | 3.9 km || 
|-id=322 bgcolor=#d6d6d6
| 474322 ||  || — || January 22, 2002 || Kitt Peak || Spacewatch || — || align=right | 2.3 km || 
|-id=323 bgcolor=#fefefe
| 474323 ||  || — || January 21, 2002 || Kitt Peak || Spacewatch || — || align=right data-sort-value="0.70" | 700 m || 
|-id=324 bgcolor=#d6d6d6
| 474324 ||  || — || January 14, 2002 || Socorro || LINEAR || — || align=right | 2.5 km || 
|-id=325 bgcolor=#E9E9E9
| 474325 ||  || — || January 20, 2002 || Kitt Peak || Spacewatch || — || align=right | 1.1 km || 
|-id=326 bgcolor=#d6d6d6
| 474326 ||  || — || January 22, 2002 || Kitt Peak || Spacewatch || — || align=right | 2.7 km || 
|-id=327 bgcolor=#E9E9E9
| 474327 ||  || — || February 19, 2002 || Socorro || LINEAR || — || align=right | 2.0 km || 
|-id=328 bgcolor=#E9E9E9
| 474328 ||  || — || March 10, 2002 || Cima Ekar || ADAS || EUN || align=right | 1.1 km || 
|-id=329 bgcolor=#E9E9E9
| 474329 ||  || — || February 10, 2002 || Socorro || LINEAR || EUN || align=right | 1.4 km || 
|-id=330 bgcolor=#d6d6d6
| 474330 ||  || — || February 11, 2002 || Socorro || LINEAR || Tj (2.99) || align=right | 4.1 km || 
|-id=331 bgcolor=#d6d6d6
| 474331 ||  || — || March 12, 2002 || Palomar || NEAT || — || align=right | 2.1 km || 
|-id=332 bgcolor=#E9E9E9
| 474332 ||  || — || March 20, 2002 || Palomar || NEAT || — || align=right | 1.5 km || 
|-id=333 bgcolor=#fefefe
| 474333 ||  || — || April 14, 2002 || Socorro || LINEAR || H || align=right data-sort-value="0.62" | 620 m || 
|-id=334 bgcolor=#E9E9E9
| 474334 ||  || — || April 8, 2002 || Palomar || NEAT || — || align=right | 1.5 km || 
|-id=335 bgcolor=#E9E9E9
| 474335 ||  || — || April 8, 2002 || Kitt Peak || Spacewatch || — || align=right | 1.6 km || 
|-id=336 bgcolor=#E9E9E9
| 474336 ||  || — || April 9, 2002 || Anderson Mesa || LONEOS || — || align=right | 1.6 km || 
|-id=337 bgcolor=#E9E9E9
| 474337 ||  || — || April 10, 2002 || Socorro || LINEAR || — || align=right | 1.5 km || 
|-id=338 bgcolor=#fefefe
| 474338 ||  || — || May 9, 2002 || Socorro || LINEAR || H || align=right data-sort-value="0.90" | 900 m || 
|-id=339 bgcolor=#E9E9E9
| 474339 ||  || — || July 8, 2002 || Palomar || NEAT || — || align=right | 1.6 km || 
|-id=340 bgcolor=#E9E9E9
| 474340 ||  || — || July 19, 2002 || Palomar || NEAT || — || align=right | 2.1 km || 
|-id=341 bgcolor=#E9E9E9
| 474341 ||  || — || July 17, 2002 || Palomar || NEAT || — || align=right | 1.8 km || 
|-id=342 bgcolor=#fefefe
| 474342 ||  || — || July 17, 2002 || Palomar || NEAT || — || align=right data-sort-value="0.62" | 620 m || 
|-id=343 bgcolor=#E9E9E9
| 474343 ||  || — || August 1, 2002 || Campo Imperatore || CINEOS || — || align=right | 2.8 km || 
|-id=344 bgcolor=#fefefe
| 474344 ||  || — || August 11, 2002 || Palomar || NEAT || — || align=right data-sort-value="0.86" | 860 m || 
|-id=345 bgcolor=#fefefe
| 474345 ||  || — || August 8, 2002 || Palomar || NEAT || — || align=right data-sort-value="0.67" | 670 m || 
|-id=346 bgcolor=#E9E9E9
| 474346 ||  || — || August 8, 2002 || Palomar || NEAT || — || align=right | 2.7 km || 
|-id=347 bgcolor=#fefefe
| 474347 ||  || — || August 11, 2002 || Palomar || NEAT || — || align=right data-sort-value="0.83" | 830 m || 
|-id=348 bgcolor=#FA8072
| 474348 ||  || — || August 16, 2002 || Palomar || NEAT || — || align=right data-sort-value="0.62" | 620 m || 
|-id=349 bgcolor=#fefefe
| 474349 ||  || — || August 28, 2002 || Palomar || NEAT || — || align=right data-sort-value="0.66" | 660 m || 
|-id=350 bgcolor=#FA8072
| 474350 ||  || — || August 29, 2002 || Palomar || S. F. Hönig || — || align=right data-sort-value="0.47" | 470 m || 
|-id=351 bgcolor=#E9E9E9
| 474351 ||  || — || August 29, 2002 || Palomar || S. F. Hönig || DOR || align=right | 2.1 km || 
|-id=352 bgcolor=#E9E9E9
| 474352 ||  || — || August 17, 2002 || Palomar || NEAT || AEO || align=right | 1.0 km || 
|-id=353 bgcolor=#fefefe
| 474353 ||  || — || August 18, 2002 || Palomar || NEAT || — || align=right data-sort-value="0.50" | 500 m || 
|-id=354 bgcolor=#fefefe
| 474354 ||  || — || August 17, 2002 || Palomar || NEAT || — || align=right data-sort-value="0.71" | 710 m || 
|-id=355 bgcolor=#fefefe
| 474355 ||  || — || August 27, 2002 || Palomar || NEAT || — || align=right data-sort-value="0.57" | 570 m || 
|-id=356 bgcolor=#E9E9E9
| 474356 ||  || — || August 18, 2002 || Palomar || NEAT || — || align=right | 2.0 km || 
|-id=357 bgcolor=#E9E9E9
| 474357 ||  || — || August 17, 2002 || Palomar || NEAT || — || align=right | 2.1 km || 
|-id=358 bgcolor=#E9E9E9
| 474358 ||  || — || August 16, 2002 || Palomar || NEAT || NEM || align=right | 2.1 km || 
|-id=359 bgcolor=#E9E9E9
| 474359 ||  || — || August 31, 2002 || Palomar || NEAT || — || align=right | 2.0 km || 
|-id=360 bgcolor=#fefefe
| 474360 ||  || — || August 16, 2002 || Palomar || NEAT || — || align=right data-sort-value="0.56" | 560 m || 
|-id=361 bgcolor=#fefefe
| 474361 ||  || — || August 16, 2002 || Palomar || NEAT || — || align=right data-sort-value="0.63" | 630 m || 
|-id=362 bgcolor=#fefefe
| 474362 ||  || — || August 18, 2002 || Palomar || NEAT || — || align=right data-sort-value="0.65" | 650 m || 
|-id=363 bgcolor=#fefefe
| 474363 ||  || — || August 18, 2002 || Palomar || NEAT || — || align=right data-sort-value="0.70" | 700 m || 
|-id=364 bgcolor=#fefefe
| 474364 ||  || — || September 4, 2002 || Anderson Mesa || LONEOS || — || align=right data-sort-value="0.73" | 730 m || 
|-id=365 bgcolor=#fefefe
| 474365 ||  || — || September 5, 2002 || Anderson Mesa || LONEOS || — || align=right data-sort-value="0.80" | 800 m || 
|-id=366 bgcolor=#FA8072
| 474366 ||  || — || September 5, 2002 || Socorro || LINEAR || — || align=right data-sort-value="0.82" | 820 m || 
|-id=367 bgcolor=#E9E9E9
| 474367 ||  || — || September 6, 2002 || Socorro || LINEAR || — || align=right | 2.4 km || 
|-id=368 bgcolor=#fefefe
| 474368 ||  || — || September 10, 2002 || Palomar || NEAT || — || align=right | 1.9 km || 
|-id=369 bgcolor=#E9E9E9
| 474369 ||  || — || September 11, 2002 || Palomar || NEAT || DOR || align=right | 2.3 km || 
|-id=370 bgcolor=#FA8072
| 474370 ||  || — || September 11, 2002 || Palomar || NEAT || — || align=right | 1.6 km || 
|-id=371 bgcolor=#fefefe
| 474371 ||  || — || September 13, 2002 || Palomar || NEAT || — || align=right data-sort-value="0.73" | 730 m || 
|-id=372 bgcolor=#E9E9E9
| 474372 ||  || — || September 14, 2002 || Palomar || NEAT || DOR || align=right | 2.2 km || 
|-id=373 bgcolor=#fefefe
| 474373 ||  || — || September 11, 2002 || Palomar || M. White, M. Collins || — || align=right data-sort-value="0.65" | 650 m || 
|-id=374 bgcolor=#E9E9E9
| 474374 ||  || — || September 14, 2002 || Palomar || NEAT || AEO || align=right data-sort-value="0.85" | 850 m || 
|-id=375 bgcolor=#fefefe
| 474375 ||  || — || September 11, 2002 || Palomar || NEAT || (2076) || align=right data-sort-value="0.57" | 570 m || 
|-id=376 bgcolor=#E9E9E9
| 474376 ||  || — || September 14, 2002 || Palomar || NEAT || — || align=right | 1.3 km || 
|-id=377 bgcolor=#fefefe
| 474377 ||  || — || September 4, 2002 || Palomar || NEAT || critical || align=right data-sort-value="0.62" | 620 m || 
|-id=378 bgcolor=#fefefe
| 474378 ||  || — || September 14, 2002 || Palomar || NEAT || V || align=right data-sort-value="0.47" | 470 m || 
|-id=379 bgcolor=#fefefe
| 474379 ||  || — || September 28, 2002 || Haleakala || NEAT || — || align=right | 2.0 km || 
|-id=380 bgcolor=#fefefe
| 474380 ||  || — || September 29, 2002 || Haleakala || NEAT || — || align=right data-sort-value="0.76" | 760 m || 
|-id=381 bgcolor=#E9E9E9
| 474381 ||  || — || September 16, 2002 || Haleakala || NEAT || — || align=right | 2.5 km || 
|-id=382 bgcolor=#fefefe
| 474382 ||  || — || September 26, 2002 || Palomar || NEAT || critical || align=right data-sort-value="0.45" | 450 m || 
|-id=383 bgcolor=#E9E9E9
| 474383 ||  || — || September 26, 2002 || Palomar || NEAT || — || align=right | 1.9 km || 
|-id=384 bgcolor=#E9E9E9
| 474384 ||  || — || October 2, 2002 || Socorro || LINEAR || — || align=right | 2.7 km || 
|-id=385 bgcolor=#E9E9E9
| 474385 ||  || — || October 2, 2002 || Socorro || LINEAR || — || align=right | 2.7 km || 
|-id=386 bgcolor=#fefefe
| 474386 ||  || — || October 5, 2002 || Palomar || NEAT || — || align=right | 1.2 km || 
|-id=387 bgcolor=#fefefe
| 474387 ||  || — || October 3, 2002 || Palomar || NEAT || — || align=right | 1.7 km || 
|-id=388 bgcolor=#E9E9E9
| 474388 ||  || — || October 4, 2002 || Palomar || NEAT || — || align=right | 1.8 km || 
|-id=389 bgcolor=#fefefe
| 474389 ||  || — || October 4, 2002 || Socorro || LINEAR || — || align=right data-sort-value="0.75" | 750 m || 
|-id=390 bgcolor=#E9E9E9
| 474390 ||  || — || October 5, 2002 || Palomar || NEAT || — || align=right | 3.0 km || 
|-id=391 bgcolor=#E9E9E9
| 474391 ||  || — || October 5, 2002 || Palomar || NEAT || — || align=right | 2.0 km || 
|-id=392 bgcolor=#FA8072
| 474392 ||  || — || October 5, 2002 || Palomar || NEAT || — || align=right data-sort-value="0.84" | 840 m || 
|-id=393 bgcolor=#E9E9E9
| 474393 ||  || — || October 1, 2002 || Socorro || LINEAR || — || align=right | 2.9 km || 
|-id=394 bgcolor=#E9E9E9
| 474394 ||  || — || October 3, 2002 || Socorro || LINEAR || — || align=right | 2.5 km || 
|-id=395 bgcolor=#fefefe
| 474395 ||  || — || October 6, 2002 || Socorro || LINEAR || — || align=right | 1.4 km || 
|-id=396 bgcolor=#fefefe
| 474396 ||  || — || October 5, 2002 || Apache Point || SDSS || — || align=right data-sort-value="0.64" | 640 m || 
|-id=397 bgcolor=#E9E9E9
| 474397 ||  || — || October 5, 2002 || Apache Point || SDSS || — || align=right | 2.1 km || 
|-id=398 bgcolor=#E9E9E9
| 474398 ||  || — || October 5, 2002 || Apache Point || SDSS || — || align=right | 1.9 km || 
|-id=399 bgcolor=#fefefe
| 474399 ||  || — || October 10, 2002 || Apache Point || SDSS || — || align=right | 1.5 km || 
|-id=400 bgcolor=#E9E9E9
| 474400 ||  || — || October 28, 2002 || Haleakala || NEAT || — || align=right | 2.6 km || 
|}

474401–474500 

|-bgcolor=#FA8072
| 474401 ||  || — || October 29, 2002 || Palomar || NEAT || critical || align=right data-sort-value="0.49" | 490 m || 
|-id=402 bgcolor=#E9E9E9
| 474402 ||  || — || October 30, 2002 || Haleakala || NEAT || DOR || align=right | 2.4 km || 
|-id=403 bgcolor=#fefefe
| 474403 ||  || — || October 30, 2002 || Palomar || NEAT || — || align=right | 1.3 km || 
|-id=404 bgcolor=#fefefe
| 474404 ||  || — || October 5, 2002 || Socorro || LINEAR || — || align=right data-sort-value="0.80" | 800 m || 
|-id=405 bgcolor=#fefefe
| 474405 ||  || — || October 11, 2002 || Socorro || LINEAR || H || align=right data-sort-value="0.94" | 940 m || 
|-id=406 bgcolor=#E9E9E9
| 474406 ||  || — || October 10, 2002 || Socorro || LINEAR || — || align=right | 3.2 km || 
|-id=407 bgcolor=#fefefe
| 474407 ||  || — || November 7, 2002 || Socorro || LINEAR || — || align=right data-sort-value="0.83" | 830 m || 
|-id=408 bgcolor=#fefefe
| 474408 ||  || — || November 11, 2002 || Socorro || LINEAR || — || align=right data-sort-value="0.71" | 710 m || 
|-id=409 bgcolor=#fefefe
| 474409 ||  || — || November 12, 2002 || Socorro || LINEAR || — || align=right data-sort-value="0.84" | 840 m || 
|-id=410 bgcolor=#d6d6d6
| 474410 ||  || — || November 4, 2002 || Palomar || NEAT || — || align=right | 2.6 km || 
|-id=411 bgcolor=#fefefe
| 474411 ||  || — || November 4, 2002 || Palomar || NEAT || — || align=right data-sort-value="0.64" | 640 m || 
|-id=412 bgcolor=#FA8072
| 474412 ||  || — || November 20, 2002 || Socorro || LINEAR || — || align=right | 1.3 km || 
|-id=413 bgcolor=#fefefe
| 474413 ||  || — || November 24, 2002 || Palomar || NEAT || H || align=right data-sort-value="0.87" | 870 m || 
|-id=414 bgcolor=#fefefe
| 474414 ||  || — || November 24, 2002 || Palomar || NEAT || — || align=right | 1.2 km || 
|-id=415 bgcolor=#fefefe
| 474415 ||  || — || November 22, 2002 || Palomar || NEAT || — || align=right data-sort-value="0.51" | 510 m || 
|-id=416 bgcolor=#E9E9E9
| 474416 ||  || — || November 16, 2002 || Palomar || NEAT || — || align=right | 2.8 km || 
|-id=417 bgcolor=#fefefe
| 474417 ||  || — || December 1, 2002 || Socorro || LINEAR || — || align=right data-sort-value="0.75" | 750 m || 
|-id=418 bgcolor=#E9E9E9
| 474418 ||  || — || December 6, 2002 || Socorro || LINEAR || — || align=right | 2.4 km || 
|-id=419 bgcolor=#fefefe
| 474419 ||  || — || December 7, 2002 || Socorro || LINEAR || — || align=right | 1.5 km || 
|-id=420 bgcolor=#fefefe
| 474420 ||  || — || November 18, 1995 || Kitt Peak || Spacewatch || — || align=right data-sort-value="0.82" | 820 m || 
|-id=421 bgcolor=#fefefe
| 474421 ||  || — || December 10, 2002 || Palomar || NEAT || — || align=right data-sort-value="0.74" | 740 m || 
|-id=422 bgcolor=#fefefe
| 474422 ||  || — || December 10, 2002 || Palomar || NEAT || — || align=right data-sort-value="0.63" | 630 m || 
|-id=423 bgcolor=#fefefe
| 474423 ||  || — || December 3, 2002 || Palomar || NEAT || NYS || align=right data-sort-value="0.45" | 450 m || 
|-id=424 bgcolor=#FA8072
| 474424 ||  || — || December 27, 2002 || Socorro || LINEAR || — || align=right | 1.0 km || 
|-id=425 bgcolor=#FFC2E0
| 474425 ||  || — || December 27, 2002 || Socorro || LINEAR || AMO || align=right data-sort-value="0.36" | 360 m || 
|-id=426 bgcolor=#fefefe
| 474426 ||  || — || January 12, 2003 || Socorro || LINEAR || — || align=right | 1.5 km || 
|-id=427 bgcolor=#fefefe
| 474427 ||  || — || January 26, 2003 || Anderson Mesa || LONEOS || — || align=right | 1.3 km || 
|-id=428 bgcolor=#fefefe
| 474428 ||  || — || February 23, 2003 || Socorro || LINEAR || — || align=right data-sort-value="0.94" | 940 m || 
|-id=429 bgcolor=#d6d6d6
| 474429 ||  || — || March 6, 2003 || Palomar || NEAT || — || align=right | 2.9 km || 
|-id=430 bgcolor=#fefefe
| 474430 ||  || — || March 6, 2003 || Socorro || LINEAR || — || align=right data-sort-value="0.90" | 900 m || 
|-id=431 bgcolor=#d6d6d6
| 474431 ||  || — || March 29, 2003 || Anderson Mesa || LONEOS || — || align=right | 3.8 km || 
|-id=432 bgcolor=#d6d6d6
| 474432 ||  || — || March 26, 2003 || Kitt Peak || Spacewatch || — || align=right | 2.6 km || 
|-id=433 bgcolor=#d6d6d6
| 474433 ||  || — || April 1, 2003 || Palomar || NEAT || — || align=right | 3.2 km || 
|-id=434 bgcolor=#d6d6d6
| 474434 ||  || — || April 4, 2003 || Kitt Peak || Spacewatch || — || align=right | 3.1 km || 
|-id=435 bgcolor=#d6d6d6
| 474435 ||  || — || March 30, 2003 || Socorro || LINEAR || THB || align=right | 3.3 km || 
|-id=436 bgcolor=#FA8072
| 474436 ||  || — || March 26, 2003 || Kitt Peak || Spacewatch || — || align=right | 1.3 km || 
|-id=437 bgcolor=#d6d6d6
| 474437 ||  || — || April 5, 2003 || Kitt Peak || Spacewatch || — || align=right | 2.7 km || 
|-id=438 bgcolor=#fefefe
| 474438 ||  || — || April 25, 2003 || Kitt Peak || Spacewatch || H || align=right data-sort-value="0.48" | 480 m || 
|-id=439 bgcolor=#d6d6d6
| 474439 ||  || — || April 30, 2003 || Haleakala || NEAT || Tj (2.94) || align=right | 3.9 km || 
|-id=440 bgcolor=#FA8072
| 474440 Nemesnagyágnes ||  ||  || July 5, 2003 || Piszkéstető || K. Sárneczky, B. Sipőcz || — || align=right data-sort-value="0.62" | 620 m || 
|-id=441 bgcolor=#FA8072
| 474441 ||  || — || July 26, 2003 || Campo Imperatore || CINEOS || — || align=right | 1.4 km || 
|-id=442 bgcolor=#FA8072
| 474442 ||  || — || August 1, 2003 || Socorro || LINEAR || — || align=right | 1.3 km || 
|-id=443 bgcolor=#FA8072
| 474443 ||  || — || August 21, 2003 || Socorro || LINEAR || — || align=right | 1.5 km || 
|-id=444 bgcolor=#E9E9E9
| 474444 ||  || — || August 20, 2003 || Palomar || NEAT || — || align=right | 1.6 km || 
|-id=445 bgcolor=#E9E9E9
| 474445 ||  || — || August 4, 2003 || Socorro || LINEAR || — || align=right | 1.4 km || 
|-id=446 bgcolor=#E9E9E9
| 474446 ||  || — || August 21, 2003 || Campo Imperatore || CINEOS || — || align=right | 1.4 km || 
|-id=447 bgcolor=#E9E9E9
| 474447 ||  || — || August 31, 2003 || Socorro || LINEAR || — || align=right | 1.5 km || 
|-id=448 bgcolor=#E9E9E9
| 474448 ||  || — || August 31, 2003 || Socorro || LINEAR || — || align=right | 2.4 km || 
|-id=449 bgcolor=#E9E9E9
| 474449 ||  || — || September 15, 2003 || Anderson Mesa || LONEOS || (1547) || align=right | 2.0 km || 
|-id=450 bgcolor=#fefefe
| 474450 ||  || — || September 17, 2003 || Kitt Peak || Spacewatch || — || align=right data-sort-value="0.62" | 620 m || 
|-id=451 bgcolor=#FFC2E0
| 474451 ||  || — || September 18, 2003 || Socorro || LINEAR || APOcritical || align=right data-sort-value="0.17" | 170 m || 
|-id=452 bgcolor=#FA8072
| 474452 ||  || — || September 18, 2003 || Kitt Peak || Spacewatch || H || align=right data-sort-value="0.67" | 670 m || 
|-id=453 bgcolor=#E9E9E9
| 474453 ||  || — || September 19, 2003 || Desert Eagle || W. K. Y. Yeung || ADE || align=right | 2.2 km || 
|-id=454 bgcolor=#E9E9E9
| 474454 ||  || — || September 16, 2003 || Palomar || NEAT || — || align=right | 2.1 km || 
|-id=455 bgcolor=#E9E9E9
| 474455 ||  || — || September 16, 2003 || Kitt Peak || Spacewatch || — || align=right | 1.5 km || 
|-id=456 bgcolor=#E9E9E9
| 474456 ||  || — || September 16, 2003 || Anderson Mesa || LONEOS || — || align=right | 1.4 km || 
|-id=457 bgcolor=#E9E9E9
| 474457 ||  || — || August 25, 2003 || Socorro || LINEAR || — || align=right | 1.9 km || 
|-id=458 bgcolor=#E9E9E9
| 474458 ||  || — || September 17, 2003 || Socorro || LINEAR || — || align=right | 1.5 km || 
|-id=459 bgcolor=#E9E9E9
| 474459 ||  || — || September 19, 2003 || Kitt Peak || Spacewatch || — || align=right | 1.4 km || 
|-id=460 bgcolor=#E9E9E9
| 474460 ||  || — || September 17, 2003 || Kitt Peak || Spacewatch || (5) || align=right data-sort-value="0.90" | 900 m || 
|-id=461 bgcolor=#E9E9E9
| 474461 ||  || — || September 16, 2003 || Palomar || NEAT || JUN || align=right | 1.4 km || 
|-id=462 bgcolor=#E9E9E9
| 474462 ||  || — || September 19, 2003 || Kitt Peak || Spacewatch || critical || align=right data-sort-value="0.68" | 680 m || 
|-id=463 bgcolor=#E9E9E9
| 474463 ||  || — || September 20, 2003 || Kitt Peak || Spacewatch || — || align=right | 1.3 km || 
|-id=464 bgcolor=#E9E9E9
| 474464 ||  || — || September 20, 2003 || Palomar || NEAT || — || align=right | 1.6 km || 
|-id=465 bgcolor=#E9E9E9
| 474465 ||  || — || September 19, 2003 || Kitt Peak || Spacewatch || — || align=right | 1.4 km || 
|-id=466 bgcolor=#fefefe
| 474466 ||  || — || September 22, 2003 || Kitt Peak || Spacewatch || — || align=right data-sort-value="0.69" | 690 m || 
|-id=467 bgcolor=#E9E9E9
| 474467 ||  || — || September 18, 2003 || Kitt Peak || Spacewatch || — || align=right | 1.6 km || 
|-id=468 bgcolor=#E9E9E9
| 474468 ||  || — || September 21, 2003 || Kitt Peak || Spacewatch || — || align=right | 1.2 km || 
|-id=469 bgcolor=#E9E9E9
| 474469 ||  || — || September 21, 2003 || Anderson Mesa || LONEOS || — || align=right | 1.6 km || 
|-id=470 bgcolor=#E9E9E9
| 474470 ||  || — || September 25, 2003 || Kleť || J. Tichá, M. Tichý || — || align=right | 1.5 km || 
|-id=471 bgcolor=#E9E9E9
| 474471 ||  || — || September 26, 2003 || Socorro || LINEAR || — || align=right | 1.8 km || 
|-id=472 bgcolor=#E9E9E9
| 474472 ||  || — || September 24, 2003 || Palomar || NEAT || — || align=right | 1.6 km || 
|-id=473 bgcolor=#fefefe
| 474473 ||  || — || September 18, 2003 || Kitt Peak || Spacewatch || H || align=right data-sort-value="0.78" | 780 m || 
|-id=474 bgcolor=#FFC2E0
| 474474 ||  || — || September 28, 2003 || Kitt Peak || Spacewatch || AMOcritical || align=right data-sort-value="0.47" | 470 m || 
|-id=475 bgcolor=#E9E9E9
| 474475 ||  || — || September 6, 2003 || Campo Imperatore || CINEOS || — || align=right | 1.4 km || 
|-id=476 bgcolor=#E9E9E9
| 474476 ||  || — || September 26, 2003 || Socorro || LINEAR || — || align=right | 1.3 km || 
|-id=477 bgcolor=#E9E9E9
| 474477 ||  || — || September 28, 2003 || Kitt Peak || Spacewatch || — || align=right | 1.2 km || 
|-id=478 bgcolor=#FA8072
| 474478 ||  || — || September 26, 2003 || Socorro || LINEAR || H || align=right data-sort-value="0.65" | 650 m || 
|-id=479 bgcolor=#E9E9E9
| 474479 ||  || — || September 29, 2003 || Kitt Peak || Spacewatch || — || align=right | 1.6 km || 
|-id=480 bgcolor=#fefefe
| 474480 ||  || — || September 30, 2003 || Kitt Peak || Spacewatch || — || align=right data-sort-value="0.59" | 590 m || 
|-id=481 bgcolor=#E9E9E9
| 474481 ||  || — || September 16, 2003 || Kitt Peak || Spacewatch || — || align=right | 1.3 km || 
|-id=482 bgcolor=#E9E9E9
| 474482 ||  || — || September 21, 2003 || Kitt Peak || Spacewatch || — || align=right | 1.4 km || 
|-id=483 bgcolor=#E9E9E9
| 474483 ||  || — || September 16, 2003 || Kitt Peak || Spacewatch || — || align=right | 1.1 km || 
|-id=484 bgcolor=#fefefe
| 474484 ||  || — || September 16, 2003 || Kitt Peak || Spacewatch || — || align=right data-sort-value="0.51" | 510 m || 
|-id=485 bgcolor=#fefefe
| 474485 ||  || — || September 16, 2003 || Kitt Peak || Spacewatch || — || align=right data-sort-value="0.63" | 630 m || 
|-id=486 bgcolor=#E9E9E9
| 474486 ||  || — || September 26, 2003 || Apache Point || SDSS || — || align=right | 1.4 km || 
|-id=487 bgcolor=#E9E9E9
| 474487 ||  || — || September 16, 2003 || Kitt Peak || Spacewatch || WIT || align=right data-sort-value="0.78" | 780 m || 
|-id=488 bgcolor=#E9E9E9
| 474488 ||  || — || September 18, 2003 || Campo Imperatore || CINEOS || — || align=right | 1.3 km || 
|-id=489 bgcolor=#E9E9E9
| 474489 ||  || — || September 26, 2003 || Apache Point || SDSS || — || align=right data-sort-value="0.98" | 980 m || 
|-id=490 bgcolor=#E9E9E9
| 474490 ||  || — || September 16, 2003 || Kitt Peak || Spacewatch || — || align=right | 1.5 km || 
|-id=491 bgcolor=#E9E9E9
| 474491 ||  || — || September 26, 2003 || Apache Point || SDSS || — || align=right | 1.4 km || 
|-id=492 bgcolor=#E9E9E9
| 474492 ||  || — || September 26, 2003 || Apache Point || SDSS || — || align=right | 1.4 km || 
|-id=493 bgcolor=#E9E9E9
| 474493 ||  || — || September 19, 2003 || Kitt Peak || Spacewatch || — || align=right | 1.3 km || 
|-id=494 bgcolor=#E9E9E9
| 474494 ||  || — || October 5, 2003 || Kitt Peak || Spacewatch || — || align=right | 1.8 km || 
|-id=495 bgcolor=#E9E9E9
| 474495 ||  || — || October 16, 2003 || Mülheim-Ruhr || Turtle Star Obs. || JUN || align=right data-sort-value="0.85" | 850 m || 
|-id=496 bgcolor=#E9E9E9
| 474496 ||  || — || October 19, 2003 || Kitt Peak || Spacewatch || ADE || align=right | 2.3 km || 
|-id=497 bgcolor=#E9E9E9
| 474497 ||  || — || October 16, 2003 || Kitt Peak || Spacewatch || — || align=right | 1.5 km || 
|-id=498 bgcolor=#E9E9E9
| 474498 ||  || — || October 17, 2003 || Kitt Peak || Spacewatch || — || align=right | 1.5 km || 
|-id=499 bgcolor=#FA8072
| 474499 ||  || — || October 21, 2003 || Socorro || LINEAR || H || align=right data-sort-value="0.67" | 670 m || 
|-id=500 bgcolor=#E9E9E9
| 474500 ||  || — || October 16, 2003 || Anderson Mesa || LONEOS || — || align=right | 1.5 km || 
|}

474501–474600 

|-bgcolor=#E9E9E9
| 474501 ||  || — || October 18, 2003 || Palomar || NEAT || — || align=right | 1.9 km || 
|-id=502 bgcolor=#E9E9E9
| 474502 ||  || — || October 17, 2003 || Anderson Mesa || LONEOS || — || align=right | 1.6 km || 
|-id=503 bgcolor=#E9E9E9
| 474503 ||  || — || October 17, 2003 || Anderson Mesa || LONEOS || — || align=right | 1.7 km || 
|-id=504 bgcolor=#E9E9E9
| 474504 ||  || — || October 17, 2003 || Anderson Mesa || LONEOS || — || align=right | 1.4 km || 
|-id=505 bgcolor=#E9E9E9
| 474505 ||  || — || October 17, 2003 || Palomar || NEAT || — || align=right | 1.8 km || 
|-id=506 bgcolor=#fefefe
| 474506 ||  || — || October 5, 2003 || Kitt Peak || Spacewatch || — || align=right data-sort-value="0.62" | 620 m || 
|-id=507 bgcolor=#E9E9E9
| 474507 ||  || — || October 17, 2003 || Anderson Mesa || LONEOS || — || align=right | 1.5 km || 
|-id=508 bgcolor=#E9E9E9
| 474508 ||  || — || October 19, 2003 || Anderson Mesa || LONEOS || EUN || align=right | 1.3 km || 
|-id=509 bgcolor=#E9E9E9
| 474509 ||  || — || September 28, 2003 || Socorro || LINEAR || — || align=right | 1.3 km || 
|-id=510 bgcolor=#E9E9E9
| 474510 ||  || — || October 1, 2003 || Kitt Peak || Spacewatch || — || align=right | 1.6 km || 
|-id=511 bgcolor=#E9E9E9
| 474511 ||  || — || October 19, 2003 || Kitt Peak || Spacewatch || — || align=right | 1.5 km || 
|-id=512 bgcolor=#E9E9E9
| 474512 ||  || — || October 20, 2003 || Socorro || LINEAR || — || align=right | 1.7 km || 
|-id=513 bgcolor=#E9E9E9
| 474513 ||  || — || October 20, 2003 || Palomar || NEAT || — || align=right | 1.3 km || 
|-id=514 bgcolor=#fefefe
| 474514 ||  || — || October 1, 2003 || Kitt Peak || Spacewatch || — || align=right data-sort-value="0.63" | 630 m || 
|-id=515 bgcolor=#E9E9E9
| 474515 ||  || — || October 21, 2003 || Socorro || LINEAR || — || align=right | 1.6 km || 
|-id=516 bgcolor=#E9E9E9
| 474516 ||  || — || October 21, 2003 || Kitt Peak || Spacewatch || ADE || align=right | 2.1 km || 
|-id=517 bgcolor=#E9E9E9
| 474517 ||  || — || October 22, 2003 || Socorro || LINEAR || EUN || align=right | 1.2 km || 
|-id=518 bgcolor=#FA8072
| 474518 ||  || — || October 23, 2003 || Anderson Mesa || LONEOS || — || align=right data-sort-value="0.74" | 740 m || 
|-id=519 bgcolor=#E9E9E9
| 474519 ||  || — || October 23, 2003 || Kitt Peak || Spacewatch || — || align=right | 1.5 km || 
|-id=520 bgcolor=#E9E9E9
| 474520 ||  || — || September 16, 2003 || Kitt Peak || Spacewatch || — || align=right | 1.1 km || 
|-id=521 bgcolor=#E9E9E9
| 474521 ||  || — || October 22, 2003 || Socorro || LINEAR || — || align=right | 1.9 km || 
|-id=522 bgcolor=#E9E9E9
| 474522 ||  || — || October 21, 2003 || Kitt Peak || Spacewatch || — || align=right | 1.8 km || 
|-id=523 bgcolor=#E9E9E9
| 474523 ||  || — || October 27, 2003 || Socorro || LINEAR || — || align=right | 1.7 km || 
|-id=524 bgcolor=#E9E9E9
| 474524 ||  || — || October 1, 2003 || Kitt Peak || Spacewatch || — || align=right | 1.8 km || 
|-id=525 bgcolor=#E9E9E9
| 474525 ||  || — || October 22, 2003 || Apache Point || SDSS || — || align=right | 1.3 km || 
|-id=526 bgcolor=#E9E9E9
| 474526 ||  || — || October 17, 2003 || Kitt Peak || Spacewatch || — || align=right | 1.9 km || 
|-id=527 bgcolor=#E9E9E9
| 474527 ||  || — || October 18, 2003 || Apache Point || SDSS || — || align=right | 1.3 km || 
|-id=528 bgcolor=#E9E9E9
| 474528 ||  || — || October 19, 2003 || Apache Point || SDSS || EUN || align=right | 1.4 km || 
|-id=529 bgcolor=#E9E9E9
| 474529 ||  || — || September 30, 2003 || Kitt Peak || Spacewatch || — || align=right | 1.6 km || 
|-id=530 bgcolor=#E9E9E9
| 474530 ||  || — || October 19, 2003 || Apache Point || SDSS || — || align=right | 1.4 km || 
|-id=531 bgcolor=#E9E9E9
| 474531 ||  || — || October 20, 2003 || Kitt Peak || Spacewatch || — || align=right | 1.5 km || 
|-id=532 bgcolor=#FFC2E0
| 474532 ||  || — || November 5, 2003 || Socorro || LINEAR || AMOcritical || align=right data-sort-value="0.63" | 630 m || 
|-id=533 bgcolor=#fefefe
| 474533 ||  || — || November 15, 2003 || Kitt Peak || Spacewatch || — || align=right data-sort-value="0.64" | 640 m || 
|-id=534 bgcolor=#E9E9E9
| 474534 ||  || — || October 18, 2003 || Anderson Mesa || LONEOS || — || align=right | 1.9 km || 
|-id=535 bgcolor=#fefefe
| 474535 ||  || — || November 16, 2003 || Kitt Peak || Spacewatch || H || align=right data-sort-value="0.79" | 790 m || 
|-id=536 bgcolor=#FA8072
| 474536 ||  || — || October 27, 2003 || Kitt Peak || Spacewatch || — || align=right data-sort-value="0.67" | 670 m || 
|-id=537 bgcolor=#E9E9E9
| 474537 ||  || — || November 18, 2003 || Kitt Peak || Spacewatch || LEO || align=right | 1.6 km || 
|-id=538 bgcolor=#FA8072
| 474538 ||  || — || November 20, 2003 || Socorro || LINEAR || — || align=right | 1.4 km || 
|-id=539 bgcolor=#E9E9E9
| 474539 ||  || — || November 16, 2003 || Kitt Peak || Spacewatch || — || align=right | 1.9 km || 
|-id=540 bgcolor=#E9E9E9
| 474540 ||  || — || November 19, 2003 || Kitt Peak || Spacewatch || — || align=right | 1.5 km || 
|-id=541 bgcolor=#E9E9E9
| 474541 ||  || — || October 23, 2003 || Kitt Peak || Spacewatch || — || align=right | 2.1 km || 
|-id=542 bgcolor=#E9E9E9
| 474542 ||  || — || November 19, 2003 || Kitt Peak || Spacewatch || — || align=right | 2.9 km || 
|-id=543 bgcolor=#E9E9E9
| 474543 ||  || — || November 19, 2003 || Kitt Peak || Spacewatch || — || align=right | 1.8 km || 
|-id=544 bgcolor=#fefefe
| 474544 ||  || — || November 19, 2003 || Kitt Peak || Spacewatch || H || align=right data-sort-value="0.62" | 620 m || 
|-id=545 bgcolor=#fefefe
| 474545 ||  || — || October 20, 2003 || Kitt Peak || Spacewatch || — || align=right data-sort-value="0.59" | 590 m || 
|-id=546 bgcolor=#fefefe
| 474546 ||  || — || November 20, 2003 || Socorro || LINEAR || — || align=right data-sort-value="0.69" | 690 m || 
|-id=547 bgcolor=#E9E9E9
| 474547 ||  || — || November 20, 2003 || Socorro || LINEAR || — || align=right | 1.8 km || 
|-id=548 bgcolor=#E9E9E9
| 474548 ||  || — || November 21, 2003 || Socorro || LINEAR || — || align=right | 1.3 km || 
|-id=549 bgcolor=#FFC2E0
| 474549 ||  || — || November 26, 2003 || Socorro || LINEAR || APO +1km || align=right | 1.5 km || 
|-id=550 bgcolor=#E9E9E9
| 474550 ||  || — || November 21, 2003 || Palomar || NEAT || JUN || align=right | 1.0 km || 
|-id=551 bgcolor=#E9E9E9
| 474551 ||  || — || December 14, 2003 || Kitt Peak || Spacewatch || — || align=right | 1.1 km || 
|-id=552 bgcolor=#E9E9E9
| 474552 ||  || — || December 16, 2003 || Catalina || CSS || JUN || align=right | 1.0 km || 
|-id=553 bgcolor=#E9E9E9
| 474553 ||  || — || December 18, 2003 || Socorro || LINEAR || — || align=right | 1.5 km || 
|-id=554 bgcolor=#FFC2E0
| 474554 ||  || — || December 22, 2003 || Kitt Peak || Spacewatch || APO +1km || align=right | 1.1 km || 
|-id=555 bgcolor=#E9E9E9
| 474555 ||  || — || December 28, 2003 || Socorro || LINEAR || — || align=right | 1.9 km || 
|-id=556 bgcolor=#E9E9E9
| 474556 ||  || — || December 29, 2003 || Socorro || LINEAR || — || align=right | 2.5 km || 
|-id=557 bgcolor=#E9E9E9
| 474557 ||  || — || December 17, 2003 || Socorro || LINEAR || — || align=right | 2.5 km || 
|-id=558 bgcolor=#E9E9E9
| 474558 ||  || — || December 22, 2003 || Socorro || LINEAR || JUN || align=right | 1.1 km || 
|-id=559 bgcolor=#E9E9E9
| 474559 ||  || — || January 15, 2004 || Kitt Peak || Spacewatch || — || align=right | 1.6 km || 
|-id=560 bgcolor=#d6d6d6
| 474560 ||  || — || January 16, 2004 || Palomar || NEAT || Tj (2.83) || align=right | 4.8 km || 
|-id=561 bgcolor=#E9E9E9
| 474561 ||  || — || January 19, 2004 || Kitt Peak || Spacewatch || — || align=right | 2.4 km || 
|-id=562 bgcolor=#E9E9E9
| 474562 ||  || — || January 21, 2004 || Socorro || LINEAR || — || align=right | 1.9 km || 
|-id=563 bgcolor=#fefefe
| 474563 ||  || — || December 22, 2003 || Kitt Peak || Spacewatch || H || align=right data-sort-value="0.75" | 750 m || 
|-id=564 bgcolor=#E9E9E9
| 474564 ||  || — || January 28, 2004 || Catalina || CSS || — || align=right | 2.0 km || 
|-id=565 bgcolor=#d6d6d6
| 474565 ||  || — || February 11, 2004 || Kitt Peak || Spacewatch || — || align=right | 1.9 km || 
|-id=566 bgcolor=#E9E9E9
| 474566 ||  || — || January 30, 2004 || Kitt Peak || Spacewatch || — || align=right | 2.0 km || 
|-id=567 bgcolor=#fefefe
| 474567 ||  || — || January 27, 2004 || Catalina || CSS || H || align=right data-sort-value="0.69" | 690 m || 
|-id=568 bgcolor=#E9E9E9
| 474568 ||  || — || January 31, 2004 || Kitt Peak || Spacewatch || DOR || align=right | 1.8 km || 
|-id=569 bgcolor=#fefefe
| 474569 ||  || — || March 12, 2004 || Palomar || NEAT || — || align=right data-sort-value="0.71" | 710 m || 
|-id=570 bgcolor=#fefefe
| 474570 ||  || — || March 14, 2004 || Palomar || NEAT || — || align=right | 1.5 km || 
|-id=571 bgcolor=#fefefe
| 474571 ||  || — || February 26, 2004 || Socorro || LINEAR || — || align=right data-sort-value="0.83" | 830 m || 
|-id=572 bgcolor=#fefefe
| 474572 ||  || — || March 14, 2004 || Kitt Peak || Spacewatch || — || align=right data-sort-value="0.72" | 720 m || 
|-id=573 bgcolor=#fefefe
| 474573 ||  || — || March 15, 2004 || Socorro || LINEAR || — || align=right | 1.1 km || 
|-id=574 bgcolor=#FFC2E0
| 474574 ||  || — || March 17, 2004 || Socorro || LINEAR || AMO || align=right data-sort-value="0.47" | 470 m || 
|-id=575 bgcolor=#d6d6d6
| 474575 ||  || — || March 23, 2004 || Socorro || LINEAR || Tj (2.9) || align=right | 2.0 km || 
|-id=576 bgcolor=#d6d6d6
| 474576 ||  || — || March 19, 2004 || Kitt Peak || Spacewatch || — || align=right | 2.0 km || 
|-id=577 bgcolor=#fefefe
| 474577 ||  || — || March 15, 2004 || Socorro || LINEAR || — || align=right data-sort-value="0.95" | 950 m || 
|-id=578 bgcolor=#fefefe
| 474578 ||  || — || March 26, 2004 || Kitt Peak || Spacewatch || NYS || align=right data-sort-value="0.54" | 540 m || 
|-id=579 bgcolor=#E9E9E9
| 474579 ||  || — || March 22, 2004 || Anderson Mesa || LONEOS || — || align=right | 2.4 km || 
|-id=580 bgcolor=#d6d6d6
| 474580 ||  || — || March 27, 2004 || Kitt Peak || Spacewatch || — || align=right | 3.3 km || 
|-id=581 bgcolor=#fefefe
| 474581 ||  || — || March 23, 2004 || Kitt Peak || Spacewatch || — || align=right data-sort-value="0.66" | 660 m || 
|-id=582 bgcolor=#d6d6d6
| 474582 ||  || — || March 27, 2004 || Socorro || LINEAR || — || align=right | 3.1 km || 
|-id=583 bgcolor=#d6d6d6
| 474583 ||  || — || April 12, 2004 || Catalina || CSS || — || align=right | 3.4 km || 
|-id=584 bgcolor=#d6d6d6
| 474584 ||  || — || April 15, 2004 || Anderson Mesa || LONEOS || — || align=right | 2.7 km || 
|-id=585 bgcolor=#FFC2E0
| 474585 ||  || — || April 19, 2004 || Socorro || LINEAR || APO || align=right data-sort-value="0.46" | 460 m || 
|-id=586 bgcolor=#fefefe
| 474586 ||  || — || March 31, 2004 || Kitt Peak || Spacewatch || — || align=right data-sort-value="0.83" | 830 m || 
|-id=587 bgcolor=#d6d6d6
| 474587 ||  || — || April 19, 2004 || Socorro || LINEAR || — || align=right | 2.7 km || 
|-id=588 bgcolor=#d6d6d6
| 474588 ||  || — || June 12, 2004 || Kitt Peak || Spacewatch || — || align=right | 2.7 km || 
|-id=589 bgcolor=#fefefe
| 474589 ||  || — || June 14, 2004 || Kitt Peak || Spacewatch || — || align=right data-sort-value="0.66" | 660 m || 
|-id=590 bgcolor=#d6d6d6
| 474590 ||  || — || July 11, 2004 || Socorro || LINEAR || — || align=right | 2.8 km || 
|-id=591 bgcolor=#d6d6d6
| 474591 ||  || — || July 14, 2004 || Socorro || LINEAR || — || align=right | 3.3 km || 
|-id=592 bgcolor=#fefefe
| 474592 ||  || — || August 8, 2004 || Campo Imperatore || CINEOS || — || align=right | 1.0 km || 
|-id=593 bgcolor=#d6d6d6
| 474593 ||  || — || August 10, 2004 || Socorro || LINEAR || — || align=right | 2.7 km || 
|-id=594 bgcolor=#d6d6d6
| 474594 ||  || — || August 10, 2004 || Socorro || LINEAR || Tj (2.9) || align=right | 4.7 km || 
|-id=595 bgcolor=#d6d6d6
| 474595 ||  || — || August 7, 2004 || Palomar || NEAT || — || align=right | 3.3 km || 
|-id=596 bgcolor=#E9E9E9
| 474596 ||  || — || September 7, 2004 || Socorro || LINEAR || — || align=right | 1.1 km || 
|-id=597 bgcolor=#fefefe
| 474597 ||  || — || September 7, 2004 || Kitt Peak || Spacewatch || — || align=right data-sort-value="0.78" | 780 m || 
|-id=598 bgcolor=#fefefe
| 474598 ||  || — || September 8, 2004 || Campo Imperatore || CINEOS || — || align=right | 1.1 km || 
|-id=599 bgcolor=#E9E9E9
| 474599 ||  || — || August 23, 2004 || Kitt Peak || Spacewatch || — || align=right data-sort-value="0.58" | 580 m || 
|-id=600 bgcolor=#d6d6d6
| 474600 ||  || — || September 7, 2004 || Palomar || NEAT || — || align=right | 4.9 km || 
|}

474601–474700 

|-bgcolor=#E9E9E9
| 474601 ||  || — || September 9, 2004 || Socorro || LINEAR || — || align=right data-sort-value="0.79" | 790 m || 
|-id=602 bgcolor=#E9E9E9
| 474602 ||  || — || September 10, 2004 || Socorro || LINEAR || — || align=right data-sort-value="0.65" | 650 m || 
|-id=603 bgcolor=#E9E9E9
| 474603 ||  || — || September 9, 2004 || Kitt Peak || Spacewatch || (5) || align=right data-sort-value="0.68" | 680 m || 
|-id=604 bgcolor=#E9E9E9
| 474604 ||  || — || September 10, 2004 || Kitt Peak || Spacewatch || — || align=right data-sort-value="0.69" | 690 m || 
|-id=605 bgcolor=#d6d6d6
| 474605 ||  || — || September 10, 2004 || Kitt Peak || Spacewatch || — || align=right | 3.2 km || 
|-id=606 bgcolor=#d6d6d6
| 474606 ||  || — || September 10, 2004 || Kitt Peak || Spacewatch || — || align=right | 3.4 km || 
|-id=607 bgcolor=#fefefe
| 474607 ||  || — || September 10, 2004 || Kitt Peak || Spacewatch || — || align=right data-sort-value="0.67" | 670 m || 
|-id=608 bgcolor=#E9E9E9
| 474608 ||  || — || September 13, 2004 || Socorro || LINEAR || — || align=right data-sort-value="0.93" | 930 m || 
|-id=609 bgcolor=#E9E9E9
| 474609 ||  || — || September 18, 2004 || Socorro || LINEAR || — || align=right data-sort-value="0.76" | 760 m || 
|-id=610 bgcolor=#d6d6d6
| 474610 ||  || — || September 10, 2004 || Kitt Peak || Spacewatch || Tj (2.99) || align=right | 4.2 km || 
|-id=611 bgcolor=#FFC2E0
| 474611 ||  || — || September 25, 2004 || Anderson Mesa || LONEOS || ATE || align=right data-sort-value="0.50" | 500 m || 
|-id=612 bgcolor=#fefefe
| 474612 ||  || — || October 8, 2004 || Anderson Mesa || LONEOS || — || align=right data-sort-value="0.58" | 580 m || 
|-id=613 bgcolor=#FFC2E0
| 474613 ||  || — || October 15, 2004 || Socorro || LINEAR || AMO || align=right data-sort-value="0.23" | 230 m || 
|-id=614 bgcolor=#E9E9E9
| 474614 ||  || — || October 4, 2004 || Kitt Peak || Spacewatch || — || align=right | 1.1 km || 
|-id=615 bgcolor=#E9E9E9
| 474615 ||  || — || October 4, 2004 || Kitt Peak || Spacewatch || — || align=right data-sort-value="0.92" | 920 m || 
|-id=616 bgcolor=#E9E9E9
| 474616 ||  || — || October 4, 2004 || Kitt Peak || Spacewatch || — || align=right data-sort-value="0.97" | 970 m || 
|-id=617 bgcolor=#E9E9E9
| 474617 ||  || — || October 5, 2004 || Kitt Peak || Spacewatch || MAR || align=right | 1.0 km || 
|-id=618 bgcolor=#fefefe
| 474618 ||  || — || October 4, 2004 || Kitt Peak || Spacewatch || — || align=right data-sort-value="0.82" | 820 m || 
|-id=619 bgcolor=#E9E9E9
| 474619 ||  || — || October 5, 2004 || Kitt Peak || Spacewatch || — || align=right data-sort-value="0.60" | 600 m || 
|-id=620 bgcolor=#E9E9E9
| 474620 ||  || — || October 6, 2004 || Kitt Peak || Spacewatch || (5) || align=right data-sort-value="0.79" | 790 m || 
|-id=621 bgcolor=#E9E9E9
| 474621 ||  || — || October 6, 2004 || Kitt Peak || Spacewatch || — || align=right data-sort-value="0.49" | 490 m || 
|-id=622 bgcolor=#E9E9E9
| 474622 ||  || — || October 6, 2004 || Kitt Peak || Spacewatch || — || align=right data-sort-value="0.95" | 950 m || 
|-id=623 bgcolor=#d6d6d6
| 474623 ||  || — || September 15, 2004 || Kitt Peak || Spacewatch || — || align=right | 3.0 km || 
|-id=624 bgcolor=#d6d6d6
| 474624 ||  || — || October 7, 2004 || Kitt Peak || Spacewatch || — || align=right | 3.1 km || 
|-id=625 bgcolor=#E9E9E9
| 474625 ||  || — || October 7, 2004 || Kitt Peak || Spacewatch || — || align=right data-sort-value="0.62" | 620 m || 
|-id=626 bgcolor=#E9E9E9
| 474626 ||  || — || October 6, 2004 || Kitt Peak || Spacewatch || critical || align=right data-sort-value="0.75" | 750 m || 
|-id=627 bgcolor=#E9E9E9
| 474627 ||  || — || October 8, 2004 || Kitt Peak || Spacewatch || — || align=right data-sort-value="0.85" | 850 m || 
|-id=628 bgcolor=#E9E9E9
| 474628 ||  || — || October 8, 2004 || Kitt Peak || Spacewatch || (5) || align=right data-sort-value="0.63" | 630 m || 
|-id=629 bgcolor=#E9E9E9
| 474629 ||  || — || October 9, 2004 || Kitt Peak || Spacewatch || critical || align=right data-sort-value="0.37" | 370 m || 
|-id=630 bgcolor=#E9E9E9
| 474630 ||  || — || October 9, 2004 || Kitt Peak || Spacewatch || (5) || align=right data-sort-value="0.56" | 560 m || 
|-id=631 bgcolor=#E9E9E9
| 474631 ||  || — || October 10, 2004 || Kitt Peak || Spacewatch || — || align=right | 1.1 km || 
|-id=632 bgcolor=#E9E9E9
| 474632 ||  || — || October 13, 2004 || Kitt Peak || Spacewatch || — || align=right data-sort-value="0.93" | 930 m || 
|-id=633 bgcolor=#d6d6d6
| 474633 ||  || — || October 18, 2004 || Goodricke-Pigott || Goodricke-Pigott Obs. || 7:4* || align=right | 3.8 km || 
|-id=634 bgcolor=#FA8072
| 474634 ||  || — || October 20, 2004 || Socorro || LINEAR || critical || align=right | 1.1 km || 
|-id=635 bgcolor=#E9E9E9
| 474635 ||  || — || November 3, 2004 || Kitt Peak || Spacewatch || (5) || align=right data-sort-value="0.55" | 550 m || 
|-id=636 bgcolor=#E9E9E9
| 474636 ||  || — || November 9, 2004 || Catalina || CSS || (5) || align=right data-sort-value="0.66" | 660 m || 
|-id=637 bgcolor=#E9E9E9
| 474637 ||  || — || November 12, 2004 || Catalina || CSS || — || align=right data-sort-value="0.76" | 760 m || 
|-id=638 bgcolor=#E9E9E9
| 474638 ||  || — || November 12, 2004 || Haleakala || NEAT || — || align=right | 2.5 km || 
|-id=639 bgcolor=#E9E9E9
| 474639 ||  || — || November 3, 2004 || Kitt Peak || Spacewatch || — || align=right data-sort-value="0.97" | 970 m || 
|-id=640 bgcolor=#C2E0FF
| 474640 Alicanto ||  ||  || November 6, 2004 || Cerro Tololo || A. C. Becker || EDDO || align=right | 226 km || 
|-id=641 bgcolor=#E9E9E9
| 474641 ||  || — || November 19, 2004 || Catalina || CSS || BRG || align=right | 1.4 km || 
|-id=642 bgcolor=#E9E9E9
| 474642 ||  || — || December 3, 2004 || Eskridge || Farpoint Obs. || — || align=right data-sort-value="0.82" | 820 m || 
|-id=643 bgcolor=#E9E9E9
| 474643 ||  || — || December 10, 2004 || Kitt Peak || Spacewatch || (5) || align=right data-sort-value="0.58" | 580 m || 
|-id=644 bgcolor=#E9E9E9
| 474644 ||  || — || December 8, 2004 || Socorro || LINEAR || — || align=right data-sort-value="0.95" | 950 m || 
|-id=645 bgcolor=#E9E9E9
| 474645 ||  || — || December 10, 2004 || Socorro || LINEAR || — || align=right | 1.1 km || 
|-id=646 bgcolor=#E9E9E9
| 474646 ||  || — || December 10, 2004 || Kitt Peak || Spacewatch || JUN || align=right | 1.1 km || 
|-id=647 bgcolor=#E9E9E9
| 474647 ||  || — || December 10, 2004 || Kitt Peak || Spacewatch || BRG || align=right | 1.4 km || 
|-id=648 bgcolor=#E9E9E9
| 474648 ||  || — || December 3, 2004 || Kitt Peak || Spacewatch || — || align=right | 1.1 km || 
|-id=649 bgcolor=#E9E9E9
| 474649 ||  || — || December 11, 2004 || Kitt Peak || Spacewatch || — || align=right | 1.3 km || 
|-id=650 bgcolor=#E9E9E9
| 474650 ||  || — || December 15, 2004 || Catalina || CSS || — || align=right | 1.4 km || 
|-id=651 bgcolor=#E9E9E9
| 474651 ||  || — || December 11, 2004 || Kitt Peak || Spacewatch || — || align=right data-sort-value="0.91" | 910 m || 
|-id=652 bgcolor=#E9E9E9
| 474652 ||  || — || December 13, 2004 || Kitt Peak || Spacewatch || — || align=right | 1.1 km || 
|-id=653 bgcolor=#E9E9E9
| 474653 ||  || — || December 12, 2004 || Kitt Peak || Spacewatch || — || align=right | 1.3 km || 
|-id=654 bgcolor=#E9E9E9
| 474654 ||  || — || December 12, 2004 || Kitt Peak || Spacewatch || — || align=right data-sort-value="0.93" | 930 m || 
|-id=655 bgcolor=#E9E9E9
| 474655 ||  || — || December 15, 2004 || Kitt Peak || Spacewatch || RAF || align=right | 1.2 km || 
|-id=656 bgcolor=#E9E9E9
| 474656 ||  || — || December 13, 2004 || Kitt Peak || Spacewatch || — || align=right data-sort-value="0.95" | 950 m || 
|-id=657 bgcolor=#E9E9E9
| 474657 ||  || — || December 18, 2004 || Mount Lemmon || Mount Lemmon Survey || — || align=right | 1.1 km || 
|-id=658 bgcolor=#E9E9E9
| 474658 ||  || — || December 18, 2004 || Mount Lemmon || Mount Lemmon Survey || (5) || align=right data-sort-value="0.82" | 820 m || 
|-id=659 bgcolor=#E9E9E9
| 474659 ||  || — || December 18, 2004 || Mount Lemmon || Mount Lemmon Survey || (5) || align=right data-sort-value="0.75" | 750 m || 
|-id=660 bgcolor=#E9E9E9
| 474660 ||  || — || January 1, 2005 || Catalina || CSS || — || align=right | 2.1 km || 
|-id=661 bgcolor=#E9E9E9
| 474661 ||  || — || December 13, 2004 || Kitt Peak || Spacewatch || — || align=right data-sort-value="0.84" | 840 m || 
|-id=662 bgcolor=#E9E9E9
| 474662 ||  || — || December 14, 2004 || Kitt Peak || Spacewatch || (5) || align=right data-sort-value="0.68" | 680 m || 
|-id=663 bgcolor=#E9E9E9
| 474663 ||  || — || January 6, 2005 || Catalina || CSS || (5) || align=right | 1.0 km || 
|-id=664 bgcolor=#E9E9E9
| 474664 ||  || — || January 6, 2005 || Socorro || LINEAR || — || align=right | 1.2 km || 
|-id=665 bgcolor=#E9E9E9
| 474665 ||  || — || January 6, 2005 || Catalina || CSS || — || align=right data-sort-value="0.94" | 940 m || 
|-id=666 bgcolor=#E9E9E9
| 474666 ||  || — || January 6, 2005 || Catalina || CSS || — || align=right | 4.0 km || 
|-id=667 bgcolor=#E9E9E9
| 474667 ||  || — || January 15, 2005 || Catalina || CSS || — || align=right | 1.2 km || 
|-id=668 bgcolor=#E9E9E9
| 474668 ||  || — || December 20, 2004 || Mount Lemmon || Mount Lemmon Survey || — || align=right data-sort-value="0.91" | 910 m || 
|-id=669 bgcolor=#E9E9E9
| 474669 ||  || — || January 15, 2005 || Kitt Peak || Spacewatch || — || align=right | 1.8 km || 
|-id=670 bgcolor=#E9E9E9
| 474670 ||  || — || January 16, 2005 || Socorro || LINEAR || (5) || align=right | 1.2 km || 
|-id=671 bgcolor=#fefefe
| 474671 ||  || — || January 17, 2005 || Kitt Peak || Spacewatch || H || align=right data-sort-value="0.55" | 550 m || 
|-id=672 bgcolor=#E9E9E9
| 474672 ||  || — || January 16, 2005 || Kitt Peak || Spacewatch || ADE || align=right | 1.6 km || 
|-id=673 bgcolor=#E9E9E9
| 474673 ||  || — || February 1, 2005 || Goodricke-Pigott || R. A. Tucker || — || align=right | 1.1 km || 
|-id=674 bgcolor=#FFC2E0
| 474674 ||  || — || February 1, 2005 || Kitt Peak || Spacewatch || AMOcritical || align=right data-sort-value="0.54" | 540 m || 
|-id=675 bgcolor=#E9E9E9
| 474675 ||  || — || February 1, 2005 || Catalina || CSS || — || align=right | 1.3 km || 
|-id=676 bgcolor=#E9E9E9
| 474676 ||  || — || February 2, 2005 || Kitt Peak || Spacewatch || JUN || align=right | 1.0 km || 
|-id=677 bgcolor=#E9E9E9
| 474677 ||  || — || March 2, 2005 || Catalina || CSS || — || align=right | 1.8 km || 
|-id=678 bgcolor=#E9E9E9
| 474678 ||  || — || March 1, 2005 || Kitt Peak || Spacewatch || — || align=right | 1.5 km || 
|-id=679 bgcolor=#E9E9E9
| 474679 ||  || — || March 4, 2005 || Kitt Peak || Spacewatch || — || align=right | 2.7 km || 
|-id=680 bgcolor=#E9E9E9
| 474680 ||  || — || February 9, 2005 || Kitt Peak || Spacewatch || — || align=right | 2.1 km || 
|-id=681 bgcolor=#E9E9E9
| 474681 ||  || — || February 3, 2005 || Socorro || LINEAR || ADE || align=right | 2.1 km || 
|-id=682 bgcolor=#E9E9E9
| 474682 ||  || — || February 2, 2005 || Catalina || CSS || (5) || align=right data-sort-value="0.64" | 640 m || 
|-id=683 bgcolor=#E9E9E9
| 474683 ||  || — || March 4, 2005 || Socorro || LINEAR || — || align=right data-sort-value="0.98" | 980 m || 
|-id=684 bgcolor=#fefefe
| 474684 ||  || — || March 8, 2005 || Mount Lemmon || Mount Lemmon Survey || Hcritical || align=right data-sort-value="0.54" | 540 m || 
|-id=685 bgcolor=#E9E9E9
| 474685 ||  || — || March 8, 2005 || Socorro || LINEAR || — || align=right | 1.4 km || 
|-id=686 bgcolor=#fefefe
| 474686 ||  || — || March 4, 2005 || Mount Lemmon || Mount Lemmon Survey || — || align=right data-sort-value="0.63" | 630 m || 
|-id=687 bgcolor=#E9E9E9
| 474687 ||  || — || March 7, 2005 || Socorro || LINEAR || — || align=right | 1.9 km || 
|-id=688 bgcolor=#E9E9E9
| 474688 ||  || — || March 10, 2005 || Mount Lemmon || Mount Lemmon Survey || — || align=right | 1.7 km || 
|-id=689 bgcolor=#fefefe
| 474689 ||  || — || March 4, 2005 || Kitt Peak || Spacewatch || — || align=right data-sort-value="0.50" | 500 m || 
|-id=690 bgcolor=#E9E9E9
| 474690 ||  || — || March 4, 2005 || Mount Lemmon || Mount Lemmon Survey || — || align=right | 1.3 km || 
|-id=691 bgcolor=#E9E9E9
| 474691 ||  || — || March 8, 2005 || Anderson Mesa || LONEOS || — || align=right data-sort-value="0.97" | 970 m || 
|-id=692 bgcolor=#E9E9E9
| 474692 ||  || — || March 11, 2005 || Catalina || CSS || — || align=right | 1.1 km || 
|-id=693 bgcolor=#E9E9E9
| 474693 ||  || — || March 11, 2005 || Mount Lemmon || Mount Lemmon Survey || — || align=right | 1.6 km || 
|-id=694 bgcolor=#E9E9E9
| 474694 ||  || — || March 11, 2005 || Anderson Mesa || LONEOS || — || align=right | 1.8 km || 
|-id=695 bgcolor=#E9E9E9
| 474695 ||  || — || March 11, 2005 || Mount Lemmon || Mount Lemmon Survey || HOF || align=right | 2.7 km || 
|-id=696 bgcolor=#E9E9E9
| 474696 ||  || — || March 11, 2005 || Mount Lemmon || Mount Lemmon Survey || — || align=right | 1.4 km || 
|-id=697 bgcolor=#E9E9E9
| 474697 ||  || — || March 13, 2005 || Catalina || CSS || EUN || align=right | 1.4 km || 
|-id=698 bgcolor=#E9E9E9
| 474698 ||  || — || April 1, 2005 || Kitt Peak || Spacewatch || — || align=right | 2.1 km || 
|-id=699 bgcolor=#d6d6d6
| 474699 ||  || — || April 1, 2005 || Anderson Mesa || LONEOS || — || align=right | 1.5 km || 
|-id=700 bgcolor=#E9E9E9
| 474700 ||  || — || April 4, 2005 || Catalina || CSS || — || align=right | 2.6 km || 
|}

474701–474800 

|-bgcolor=#fefefe
| 474701 ||  || — || April 7, 2005 || Socorro || LINEAR || H || align=right data-sort-value="0.50" | 500 m || 
|-id=702 bgcolor=#E9E9E9
| 474702 ||  || — || March 14, 2005 || Mount Lemmon || Mount Lemmon Survey || — || align=right | 2.1 km || 
|-id=703 bgcolor=#fefefe
| 474703 ||  || — || March 10, 2005 || Mount Lemmon || Mount Lemmon Survey || — || align=right data-sort-value="0.66" | 660 m || 
|-id=704 bgcolor=#fefefe
| 474704 ||  || — || April 5, 2005 || Catalina || CSS || H || align=right data-sort-value="0.80" | 800 m || 
|-id=705 bgcolor=#E9E9E9
| 474705 ||  || — || April 11, 2005 || Kitt Peak || Spacewatch || — || align=right | 1.6 km || 
|-id=706 bgcolor=#FFC2E0
| 474706 ||  || — || April 12, 2005 || Anderson Mesa || LONEOS || AMO || align=right data-sort-value="0.45" | 450 m || 
|-id=707 bgcolor=#E9E9E9
| 474707 ||  || — || April 11, 2005 || Kitt Peak || Spacewatch || DOR || align=right | 2.2 km || 
|-id=708 bgcolor=#E9E9E9
| 474708 ||  || — || April 10, 2005 || Mount Lemmon || Mount Lemmon Survey || — || align=right | 2.0 km || 
|-id=709 bgcolor=#d6d6d6
| 474709 ||  || — || March 17, 2005 || Mount Lemmon || Mount Lemmon Survey || 3:2 || align=right | 4.9 km || 
|-id=710 bgcolor=#fefefe
| 474710 ||  || — || April 7, 2005 || Kitt Peak || Spacewatch || — || align=right data-sort-value="0.66" | 660 m || 
|-id=711 bgcolor=#E9E9E9
| 474711 ||  || — || April 1, 2005 || Kitt Peak || Spacewatch || PAD || align=right | 1.5 km || 
|-id=712 bgcolor=#E9E9E9
| 474712 ||  || — || April 6, 2005 || Kitt Peak || Spacewatch || — || align=right | 1.5 km || 
|-id=713 bgcolor=#E9E9E9
| 474713 ||  || — || April 10, 2005 || Mount Lemmon || Mount Lemmon Survey || AGN || align=right | 1.1 km || 
|-id=714 bgcolor=#fefefe
| 474714 ||  || — || April 4, 2005 || Mount Lemmon || Mount Lemmon Survey || — || align=right data-sort-value="0.69" | 690 m || 
|-id=715 bgcolor=#E9E9E9
| 474715 ||  || — || May 4, 2005 || Mauna Kea || C. Veillet || AST || align=right | 1.6 km || 
|-id=716 bgcolor=#fefefe
| 474716 ||  || — || May 4, 2005 || Kitt Peak || Spacewatch || — || align=right data-sort-value="0.62" | 620 m || 
|-id=717 bgcolor=#fefefe
| 474717 ||  || — || May 4, 2005 || Kitt Peak || Spacewatch || — || align=right data-sort-value="0.67" | 670 m || 
|-id=718 bgcolor=#fefefe
| 474718 ||  || — || May 8, 2005 || Kitt Peak || Spacewatch || H || align=right data-sort-value="0.72" | 720 m || 
|-id=719 bgcolor=#fefefe
| 474719 ||  || — || May 10, 2005 || Kitt Peak || Spacewatch || — || align=right data-sort-value="0.76" | 760 m || 
|-id=720 bgcolor=#E9E9E9
| 474720 ||  || — || May 7, 2005 || Mount Lemmon || Mount Lemmon Survey || — || align=right | 2.4 km || 
|-id=721 bgcolor=#fefefe
| 474721 ||  || — || May 3, 2005 || Kitt Peak || Spacewatch || — || align=right data-sort-value="0.63" | 630 m || 
|-id=722 bgcolor=#fefefe
| 474722 ||  || — || June 13, 2005 || Mount Lemmon || Mount Lemmon Survey || — || align=right data-sort-value="0.79" | 790 m || 
|-id=723 bgcolor=#fefefe
| 474723 ||  || — || May 20, 2005 || Mount Lemmon || Mount Lemmon Survey || — || align=right data-sort-value="0.90" | 900 m || 
|-id=724 bgcolor=#FA8072
| 474724 ||  || — || June 13, 2005 || Mount Lemmon || Mount Lemmon Survey || critical || align=right data-sort-value="0.68" | 680 m || 
|-id=725 bgcolor=#d6d6d6
| 474725 ||  || — || June 17, 2005 || Mount Lemmon || Mount Lemmon Survey || — || align=right | 2.6 km || 
|-id=726 bgcolor=#d6d6d6
| 474726 ||  || — || June 29, 2005 || Kitt Peak || Spacewatch || — || align=right | 4.1 km || 
|-id=727 bgcolor=#d6d6d6
| 474727 ||  || — || June 29, 2005 || Kitt Peak || Spacewatch || — || align=right | 2.9 km || 
|-id=728 bgcolor=#d6d6d6
| 474728 ||  || — || June 29, 2005 || Kitt Peak || Spacewatch || — || align=right | 3.4 km || 
|-id=729 bgcolor=#d6d6d6
| 474729 ||  || — || June 29, 2005 || Kitt Peak || Spacewatch || EOS || align=right | 1.9 km || 
|-id=730 bgcolor=#fefefe
| 474730 ||  || — || June 29, 2005 || Anderson Mesa || LONEOS || — || align=right data-sort-value="0.89" | 890 m || 
|-id=731 bgcolor=#fefefe
| 474731 ||  || — || June 30, 2005 || Kitt Peak || Spacewatch || — || align=right data-sort-value="0.77" | 770 m || 
|-id=732 bgcolor=#d6d6d6
| 474732 ||  || — || July 1, 2005 || Kitt Peak || Spacewatch || — || align=right | 2.8 km || 
|-id=733 bgcolor=#fefefe
| 474733 ||  || — || July 3, 2005 || Mount Lemmon || Mount Lemmon Survey || NYS || align=right data-sort-value="0.49" | 490 m || 
|-id=734 bgcolor=#d6d6d6
| 474734 ||  || — || July 4, 2005 || Mount Lemmon || Mount Lemmon Survey || — || align=right | 2.8 km || 
|-id=735 bgcolor=#d6d6d6
| 474735 ||  || — || July 4, 2005 || Kitt Peak || Spacewatch || — || align=right | 3.1 km || 
|-id=736 bgcolor=#fefefe
| 474736 ||  || — || July 5, 2005 || Palomar || NEAT || — || align=right data-sort-value="0.64" | 640 m || 
|-id=737 bgcolor=#fefefe
| 474737 ||  || — || July 4, 2005 || Kitt Peak || Spacewatch || NYS || align=right data-sort-value="0.63" | 630 m || 
|-id=738 bgcolor=#d6d6d6
| 474738 ||  || — || July 5, 2005 || Kitt Peak || Spacewatch || THMcritical || align=right | 2.1 km || 
|-id=739 bgcolor=#fefefe
| 474739 ||  || — || July 10, 2005 || Kitt Peak || Spacewatch || — || align=right data-sort-value="0.64" | 640 m || 
|-id=740 bgcolor=#fefefe
| 474740 ||  || — || July 5, 2005 || Kitt Peak || Spacewatch || — || align=right data-sort-value="0.70" | 700 m || 
|-id=741 bgcolor=#d6d6d6
| 474741 ||  || — || July 3, 2005 || Mount Lemmon || Mount Lemmon Survey || — || align=right | 2.3 km || 
|-id=742 bgcolor=#d6d6d6
| 474742 ||  || — || July 7, 2005 || Mauna Kea || C. Veillet || — || align=right | 1.7 km || 
|-id=743 bgcolor=#fefefe
| 474743 ||  || — || May 15, 2005 || Mount Lemmon || Mount Lemmon Survey || — || align=right data-sort-value="0.63" | 630 m || 
|-id=744 bgcolor=#d6d6d6
| 474744 ||  || — || July 29, 2005 || Palomar || NEAT || — || align=right | 3.9 km || 
|-id=745 bgcolor=#fefefe
| 474745 ||  || — || July 30, 2005 || Palomar || NEAT || ERI || align=right | 1.3 km || 
|-id=746 bgcolor=#fefefe
| 474746 ||  || — || July 30, 2005 || Palomar || NEAT || — || align=right data-sort-value="0.59" | 590 m || 
|-id=747 bgcolor=#d6d6d6
| 474747 ||  || — || July 26, 2005 || Palomar || NEAT || — || align=right | 2.7 km || 
|-id=748 bgcolor=#FA8072
| 474748 ||  || — || August 6, 2005 || Socorro || LINEAR || — || align=right data-sort-value="0.94" | 940 m || 
|-id=749 bgcolor=#fefefe
| 474749 ||  || — || August 4, 2005 || Palomar || NEAT || — || align=right data-sort-value="0.72" | 720 m || 
|-id=750 bgcolor=#d6d6d6
| 474750 ||  || — || August 8, 2005 || Cerro Tololo || M. W. Buie || EOS || align=right | 1.6 km || 
|-id=751 bgcolor=#d6d6d6
| 474751 ||  || — || August 24, 2005 || Palomar || NEAT || — || align=right | 3.2 km || 
|-id=752 bgcolor=#fefefe
| 474752 ||  || — || August 27, 2005 || Kitt Peak || Spacewatch || MAS || align=right data-sort-value="0.73" | 730 m || 
|-id=753 bgcolor=#d6d6d6
| 474753 ||  || — || August 27, 2005 || Kitt Peak || Spacewatch || — || align=right | 2.0 km || 
|-id=754 bgcolor=#fefefe
| 474754 ||  || — || August 25, 2005 || Palomar || NEAT || — || align=right data-sort-value="0.74" | 740 m || 
|-id=755 bgcolor=#fefefe
| 474755 ||  || — || August 25, 2005 || Palomar || NEAT || — || align=right data-sort-value="0.65" | 650 m || 
|-id=756 bgcolor=#d6d6d6
| 474756 ||  || — || August 25, 2005 || Palomar || NEAT || — || align=right | 3.5 km || 
|-id=757 bgcolor=#fefefe
| 474757 ||  || — || August 26, 2005 || Palomar || NEAT || MAS || align=right data-sort-value="0.62" | 620 m || 
|-id=758 bgcolor=#fefefe
| 474758 ||  || — || August 26, 2005 || Palomar || NEAT || NYS || align=right data-sort-value="0.59" | 590 m || 
|-id=759 bgcolor=#d6d6d6
| 474759 ||  || — || August 26, 2005 || Palomar || NEAT || — || align=right | 3.4 km || 
|-id=760 bgcolor=#d6d6d6
| 474760 ||  || — || August 28, 2005 || Kitt Peak || Spacewatch || — || align=right | 2.9 km || 
|-id=761 bgcolor=#d6d6d6
| 474761 ||  || — || August 24, 2005 || Palomar || NEAT || — || align=right | 3.5 km || 
|-id=762 bgcolor=#fefefe
| 474762 ||  || — || August 27, 2005 || Anderson Mesa || LONEOS || (2076) || align=right | 1.00 km || 
|-id=763 bgcolor=#FA8072
| 474763 ||  || — || August 25, 2005 || Reedy Creek || J. Broughton || — || align=right | 1.1 km || 
|-id=764 bgcolor=#fefefe
| 474764 ||  || — || August 29, 2005 || Socorro || LINEAR || MAS || align=right data-sort-value="0.71" | 710 m || 
|-id=765 bgcolor=#d6d6d6
| 474765 ||  || — || August 29, 2005 || Anderson Mesa || LONEOS || — || align=right | 2.5 km || 
|-id=766 bgcolor=#fefefe
| 474766 ||  || — || August 26, 2005 || Anderson Mesa || LONEOS || NYS || align=right data-sort-value="0.60" | 600 m || 
|-id=767 bgcolor=#fefefe
| 474767 ||  || — || August 26, 2005 || Palomar || NEAT || NYS || align=right data-sort-value="0.63" | 630 m || 
|-id=768 bgcolor=#d6d6d6
| 474768 ||  || — || August 27, 2005 || Palomar || NEAT || — || align=right | 2.8 km || 
|-id=769 bgcolor=#d6d6d6
| 474769 ||  || — || August 27, 2005 || Palomar || NEAT || — || align=right | 3.2 km || 
|-id=770 bgcolor=#fefefe
| 474770 ||  || — || August 27, 2005 || Palomar || NEAT || — || align=right data-sort-value="0.95" | 950 m || 
|-id=771 bgcolor=#fefefe
| 474771 ||  || — || August 28, 2005 || Kitt Peak || Spacewatch || MAS || align=right data-sort-value="0.67" | 670 m || 
|-id=772 bgcolor=#d6d6d6
| 474772 ||  || — || August 28, 2005 || Kitt Peak || Spacewatch || — || align=right | 2.5 km || 
|-id=773 bgcolor=#d6d6d6
| 474773 ||  || — || August 28, 2005 || Kitt Peak || Spacewatch || — || align=right | 1.9 km || 
|-id=774 bgcolor=#d6d6d6
| 474774 ||  || — || August 28, 2005 || Kitt Peak || Spacewatch || — || align=right | 2.0 km || 
|-id=775 bgcolor=#d6d6d6
| 474775 ||  || — || August 28, 2005 || Kitt Peak || Spacewatch || — || align=right | 2.8 km || 
|-id=776 bgcolor=#d6d6d6
| 474776 ||  || — || August 28, 2005 || Kitt Peak || Spacewatch || THMcritical || align=right | 1.9 km || 
|-id=777 bgcolor=#d6d6d6
| 474777 ||  || — || August 28, 2005 || Kitt Peak || Spacewatch || — || align=right | 2.0 km || 
|-id=778 bgcolor=#d6d6d6
| 474778 ||  || — || August 28, 2005 || Kitt Peak || Spacewatch || — || align=right | 2.9 km || 
|-id=779 bgcolor=#fefefe
| 474779 ||  || — || August 28, 2005 || Kitt Peak || Spacewatch || — || align=right data-sort-value="0.85" | 850 m || 
|-id=780 bgcolor=#d6d6d6
| 474780 ||  || — || August 28, 2005 || Kitt Peak || Spacewatch || — || align=right | 3.9 km || 
|-id=781 bgcolor=#d6d6d6
| 474781 ||  || — || August 28, 2005 || Kitt Peak || Spacewatch || — || align=right | 2.8 km || 
|-id=782 bgcolor=#fefefe
| 474782 ||  || — || August 28, 2005 || Kitt Peak || Spacewatch || — || align=right data-sort-value="0.67" | 670 m || 
|-id=783 bgcolor=#d6d6d6
| 474783 ||  || — || August 28, 2005 || Kitt Peak || Spacewatch || THM || align=right | 1.8 km || 
|-id=784 bgcolor=#d6d6d6
| 474784 ||  || — || August 28, 2005 || Kitt Peak || Spacewatch || — || align=right | 2.0 km || 
|-id=785 bgcolor=#d6d6d6
| 474785 ||  || — || August 28, 2005 || Kitt Peak || Spacewatch || (1298) || align=right | 2.5 km || 
|-id=786 bgcolor=#d6d6d6
| 474786 ||  || — || August 30, 2005 || Campo Imperatore || CINEOS || — || align=right | 3.2 km || 
|-id=787 bgcolor=#d6d6d6
| 474787 ||  || — || August 28, 2005 || Siding Spring || SSS || — || align=right | 3.5 km || 
|-id=788 bgcolor=#d6d6d6
| 474788 ||  || — || August 30, 2005 || Kitt Peak || Spacewatch || — || align=right | 2.9 km || 
|-id=789 bgcolor=#d6d6d6
| 474789 ||  || — || August 28, 2005 || Anderson Mesa || LONEOS || THB || align=right | 4.3 km || 
|-id=790 bgcolor=#fefefe
| 474790 ||  || — || August 28, 2005 || Anderson Mesa || LONEOS || H || align=right data-sort-value="0.82" | 820 m || 
|-id=791 bgcolor=#fefefe
| 474791 ||  || — || August 25, 2005 || Palomar || NEAT || MAScritical || align=right data-sort-value="0.54" | 540 m || 
|-id=792 bgcolor=#d6d6d6
| 474792 ||  || — || August 25, 2005 || Palomar || NEAT || — || align=right | 3.6 km || 
|-id=793 bgcolor=#fefefe
| 474793 ||  || — || August 29, 2005 || Kitt Peak || Spacewatch || NYS || align=right data-sort-value="0.58" | 580 m || 
|-id=794 bgcolor=#d6d6d6
| 474794 ||  || — || August 31, 2005 || Kitt Peak || Spacewatch || — || align=right | 2.5 km || 
|-id=795 bgcolor=#d6d6d6
| 474795 ||  || — || August 31, 2005 || Kitt Peak || Spacewatch || — || align=right | 2.7 km || 
|-id=796 bgcolor=#fefefe
| 474796 ||  || — || September 6, 2005 || Anderson Mesa || LONEOS || NYS || align=right data-sort-value="0.64" | 640 m || 
|-id=797 bgcolor=#fefefe
| 474797 ||  || — || September 1, 2005 || Kitt Peak || Spacewatch || — || align=right data-sort-value="0.88" | 880 m || 
|-id=798 bgcolor=#d6d6d6
| 474798 ||  || — || September 11, 2005 || Anderson Mesa || LONEOS || — || align=right | 2.3 km || 
|-id=799 bgcolor=#d6d6d6
| 474799 ||  || — || August 29, 2005 || Kitt Peak || Spacewatch || — || align=right | 2.4 km || 
|-id=800 bgcolor=#fefefe
| 474800 ||  || — || September 12, 2005 || Kitt Peak || Spacewatch || MAS || align=right data-sort-value="0.56" | 560 m || 
|}

474801–474900 

|-bgcolor=#fefefe
| 474801 ||  || — || August 31, 2005 || Kitt Peak || Spacewatch || — || align=right data-sort-value="0.75" | 750 m || 
|-id=802 bgcolor=#d6d6d6
| 474802 ||  || — || September 14, 2005 || Kitt Peak || Spacewatch || EOS || align=right | 3.3 km || 
|-id=803 bgcolor=#d6d6d6
| 474803 ||  || — || September 2, 2005 || Palomar || NEAT || — || align=right | 2.8 km || 
|-id=804 bgcolor=#fefefe
| 474804 ||  || — || September 23, 2005 || Kitt Peak || Spacewatch || — || align=right data-sort-value="0.98" | 980 m || 
|-id=805 bgcolor=#d6d6d6
| 474805 ||  || — || September 23, 2005 || Kitt Peak || Spacewatch || THM || align=right | 2.2 km || 
|-id=806 bgcolor=#d6d6d6
| 474806 ||  || — || September 23, 2005 || Kitt Peak || Spacewatch || HYG || align=right | 2.5 km || 
|-id=807 bgcolor=#fefefe
| 474807 ||  || — || September 23, 2005 || Kitt Peak || Spacewatch || MAS || align=right data-sort-value="0.65" | 650 m || 
|-id=808 bgcolor=#fefefe
| 474808 ||  || — || September 24, 2005 || Kitt Peak || Spacewatch || — || align=right data-sort-value="0.68" | 680 m || 
|-id=809 bgcolor=#d6d6d6
| 474809 ||  || — || September 24, 2005 || Kitt Peak || Spacewatch || EOS || align=right | 1.5 km || 
|-id=810 bgcolor=#fefefe
| 474810 ||  || — || September 26, 2005 || Kitt Peak || Spacewatch || — || align=right data-sort-value="0.71" | 710 m || 
|-id=811 bgcolor=#d6d6d6
| 474811 ||  || — || September 26, 2005 || Kitt Peak || Spacewatch || EOS || align=right | 1.9 km || 
|-id=812 bgcolor=#d6d6d6
| 474812 ||  || — || September 26, 2005 || Kitt Peak || Spacewatch || — || align=right | 3.0 km || 
|-id=813 bgcolor=#fefefe
| 474813 ||  || — || September 26, 2005 || Kitt Peak || Spacewatch || MAS || align=right data-sort-value="0.59" | 590 m || 
|-id=814 bgcolor=#d6d6d6
| 474814 ||  || — || September 23, 2005 || Catalina || CSS || — || align=right | 4.7 km || 
|-id=815 bgcolor=#d6d6d6
| 474815 ||  || — || August 30, 2005 || Kitt Peak || Spacewatch || THM || align=right | 2.0 km || 
|-id=816 bgcolor=#fefefe
| 474816 ||  || — || September 23, 2005 || Kitt Peak || Spacewatch || NYS || align=right data-sort-value="0.68" | 680 m || 
|-id=817 bgcolor=#d6d6d6
| 474817 ||  || — || September 24, 2005 || Kitt Peak || Spacewatch || — || align=right | 3.5 km || 
|-id=818 bgcolor=#fefefe
| 474818 ||  || — || September 24, 2005 || Kitt Peak || Spacewatch || MAS || align=right data-sort-value="0.58" | 580 m || 
|-id=819 bgcolor=#d6d6d6
| 474819 ||  || — || September 24, 2005 || Kitt Peak || Spacewatch || — || align=right | 1.8 km || 
|-id=820 bgcolor=#d6d6d6
| 474820 ||  || — || September 24, 2005 || Kitt Peak || Spacewatch || — || align=right | 2.3 km || 
|-id=821 bgcolor=#fefefe
| 474821 ||  || — || September 24, 2005 || Kitt Peak || Spacewatch || — || align=right data-sort-value="0.82" | 820 m || 
|-id=822 bgcolor=#fefefe
| 474822 ||  || — || September 24, 2005 || Kitt Peak || Spacewatch || — || align=right data-sort-value="0.74" | 740 m || 
|-id=823 bgcolor=#d6d6d6
| 474823 ||  || — || September 24, 2005 || Kitt Peak || Spacewatch || — || align=right | 3.7 km || 
|-id=824 bgcolor=#d6d6d6
| 474824 ||  || — || September 24, 2005 || Kitt Peak || Spacewatch || — || align=right | 2.6 km || 
|-id=825 bgcolor=#fefefe
| 474825 ||  || — || September 24, 2005 || Kitt Peak || Spacewatch || NYS || align=right data-sort-value="0.62" | 620 m || 
|-id=826 bgcolor=#fefefe
| 474826 ||  || — || September 24, 2005 || Kitt Peak || Spacewatch || — || align=right data-sort-value="0.63" | 630 m || 
|-id=827 bgcolor=#d6d6d6
| 474827 ||  || — || September 24, 2005 || Kitt Peak || Spacewatch || — || align=right | 2.2 km || 
|-id=828 bgcolor=#fefefe
| 474828 ||  || — || September 24, 2005 || Kitt Peak || Spacewatch || H || align=right data-sort-value="0.70" | 700 m || 
|-id=829 bgcolor=#fefefe
| 474829 ||  || — || September 25, 2005 || Kitt Peak || Spacewatch || — || align=right data-sort-value="0.69" | 690 m || 
|-id=830 bgcolor=#d6d6d6
| 474830 ||  || — || September 25, 2005 || Kitt Peak || Spacewatch || — || align=right | 4.6 km || 
|-id=831 bgcolor=#d6d6d6
| 474831 ||  || — || September 26, 2005 || Kitt Peak || Spacewatch || — || align=right | 2.6 km || 
|-id=832 bgcolor=#d6d6d6
| 474832 ||  || — || September 26, 2005 || Kitt Peak || Spacewatch || — || align=right | 2.5 km || 
|-id=833 bgcolor=#fefefe
| 474833 ||  || — || August 30, 2005 || Kitt Peak || Spacewatch || — || align=right data-sort-value="0.72" | 720 m || 
|-id=834 bgcolor=#fefefe
| 474834 ||  || — || September 26, 2005 || Palomar || NEAT || MAS || align=right data-sort-value="0.57" | 570 m || 
|-id=835 bgcolor=#fefefe
| 474835 ||  || — || September 26, 2005 || Kitt Peak || Spacewatch || NYS || align=right data-sort-value="0.73" | 730 m || 
|-id=836 bgcolor=#fefefe
| 474836 ||  || — || September 26, 2005 || Kitt Peak || Spacewatch || — || align=right data-sort-value="0.78" | 780 m || 
|-id=837 bgcolor=#d6d6d6
| 474837 ||  || — || September 27, 2005 || Kitt Peak || Spacewatch || EOS || align=right | 1.7 km || 
|-id=838 bgcolor=#d6d6d6
| 474838 ||  || — || September 27, 2005 || Kitt Peak || Spacewatch || — || align=right | 2.4 km || 
|-id=839 bgcolor=#d6d6d6
| 474839 ||  || — || September 27, 2005 || Kitt Peak || Spacewatch || — || align=right | 2.4 km || 
|-id=840 bgcolor=#d6d6d6
| 474840 ||  || — || September 27, 2005 || Kitt Peak || Spacewatch || HYG || align=right | 2.6 km || 
|-id=841 bgcolor=#d6d6d6
| 474841 ||  || — || September 23, 2005 || Catalina || CSS || — || align=right | 3.2 km || 
|-id=842 bgcolor=#fefefe
| 474842 ||  || — || September 24, 2005 || Kitt Peak || Spacewatch || — || align=right data-sort-value="0.65" | 650 m || 
|-id=843 bgcolor=#fefefe
| 474843 ||  || — || September 24, 2005 || Kitt Peak || Spacewatch || MAS || align=right data-sort-value="0.72" | 720 m || 
|-id=844 bgcolor=#d6d6d6
| 474844 ||  || — || September 24, 2005 || Kitt Peak || Spacewatch || VER || align=right | 2.2 km || 
|-id=845 bgcolor=#fefefe
| 474845 ||  || — || September 24, 2005 || Kitt Peak || Spacewatch || — || align=right data-sort-value="0.79" | 790 m || 
|-id=846 bgcolor=#d6d6d6
| 474846 ||  || — || September 24, 2005 || Kitt Peak || Spacewatch || THM || align=right | 2.6 km || 
|-id=847 bgcolor=#fefefe
| 474847 ||  || — || September 24, 2005 || Kitt Peak || Spacewatch || — || align=right data-sort-value="0.76" | 760 m || 
|-id=848 bgcolor=#d6d6d6
| 474848 ||  || — || September 14, 2005 || Kitt Peak || Spacewatch || critical || align=right | 2.1 km || 
|-id=849 bgcolor=#d6d6d6
| 474849 ||  || — || September 24, 2005 || Kitt Peak || Spacewatch || — || align=right | 2.6 km || 
|-id=850 bgcolor=#fefefe
| 474850 ||  || — || September 1, 2005 || Campo Imperatore || CINEOS || — || align=right data-sort-value="0.74" | 740 m || 
|-id=851 bgcolor=#d6d6d6
| 474851 ||  || — || September 24, 2005 || Kitt Peak || Spacewatch || — || align=right | 2.1 km || 
|-id=852 bgcolor=#d6d6d6
| 474852 ||  || — || September 24, 2005 || Kitt Peak || Spacewatch || — || align=right | 2.2 km || 
|-id=853 bgcolor=#d6d6d6
| 474853 ||  || — || September 24, 2005 || Kitt Peak || Spacewatch || LIX || align=right | 3.9 km || 
|-id=854 bgcolor=#fefefe
| 474854 ||  || — || September 24, 2005 || Kitt Peak || Spacewatch || — || align=right data-sort-value="0.73" | 730 m || 
|-id=855 bgcolor=#fefefe
| 474855 ||  || — || September 24, 2005 || Kitt Peak || Spacewatch || — || align=right data-sort-value="0.71" | 710 m || 
|-id=856 bgcolor=#d6d6d6
| 474856 ||  || — || September 24, 2005 || Kitt Peak || Spacewatch || — || align=right | 3.1 km || 
|-id=857 bgcolor=#d6d6d6
| 474857 ||  || — || September 25, 2005 || Kitt Peak || Spacewatch || — || align=right | 2.6 km || 
|-id=858 bgcolor=#fefefe
| 474858 ||  || — || September 25, 2005 || Kitt Peak || Spacewatch || — || align=right data-sort-value="0.64" | 640 m || 
|-id=859 bgcolor=#d6d6d6
| 474859 ||  || — || September 25, 2005 || Kitt Peak || Spacewatch || VER || align=right | 2.5 km || 
|-id=860 bgcolor=#fefefe
| 474860 ||  || — || September 27, 2005 || Kitt Peak || Spacewatch || NYS || align=right data-sort-value="0.64" | 640 m || 
|-id=861 bgcolor=#d6d6d6
| 474861 ||  || — || September 29, 2005 || Mount Lemmon || Mount Lemmon Survey || THM || align=right | 2.6 km || 
|-id=862 bgcolor=#d6d6d6
| 474862 ||  || — || September 29, 2005 || Kitt Peak || Spacewatch || — || align=right | 2.9 km || 
|-id=863 bgcolor=#fefefe
| 474863 ||  || — || September 29, 2005 || Kitt Peak || Spacewatch || MAScritical || align=right data-sort-value="0.54" | 540 m || 
|-id=864 bgcolor=#fefefe
| 474864 ||  || — || August 31, 2005 || Kitt Peak || Spacewatch || — || align=right data-sort-value="0.63" | 630 m || 
|-id=865 bgcolor=#fefefe
| 474865 ||  || — || September 24, 2005 || Kitt Peak || Spacewatch || MAS || align=right data-sort-value="0.49" | 490 m || 
|-id=866 bgcolor=#d6d6d6
| 474866 ||  || — || September 13, 2005 || Socorro || LINEAR || critical || align=right | 2.2 km || 
|-id=867 bgcolor=#d6d6d6
| 474867 ||  || — || September 25, 2005 || Kitt Peak || Spacewatch || ELF || align=right | 2.7 km || 
|-id=868 bgcolor=#fefefe
| 474868 ||  || — || September 25, 2005 || Kitt Peak || Spacewatch || NYS || align=right data-sort-value="0.60" | 600 m || 
|-id=869 bgcolor=#d6d6d6
| 474869 ||  || — || September 25, 2005 || Kitt Peak || Spacewatch || — || align=right | 2.3 km || 
|-id=870 bgcolor=#d6d6d6
| 474870 ||  || — || September 25, 2005 || Kitt Peak || Spacewatch || — || align=right | 2.8 km || 
|-id=871 bgcolor=#d6d6d6
| 474871 ||  || — || September 25, 2005 || Kitt Peak || Spacewatch || — || align=right | 2.7 km || 
|-id=872 bgcolor=#d6d6d6
| 474872 ||  || — || September 25, 2005 || Kitt Peak || Spacewatch || — || align=right | 2.0 km || 
|-id=873 bgcolor=#d6d6d6
| 474873 ||  || — || September 25, 2005 || Kitt Peak || Spacewatch || — || align=right | 2.4 km || 
|-id=874 bgcolor=#d6d6d6
| 474874 ||  || — || September 25, 2005 || Kitt Peak || Spacewatch || — || align=right | 2.9 km || 
|-id=875 bgcolor=#fefefe
| 474875 ||  || — || September 25, 2005 || Kitt Peak || Spacewatch || — || align=right data-sort-value="0.60" | 600 m || 
|-id=876 bgcolor=#d6d6d6
| 474876 ||  || — || September 25, 2005 || Kitt Peak || Spacewatch || THM || align=right | 2.1 km || 
|-id=877 bgcolor=#fefefe
| 474877 ||  || — || September 25, 2005 || Kitt Peak || Spacewatch || NYS || align=right data-sort-value="0.76" | 760 m || 
|-id=878 bgcolor=#d6d6d6
| 474878 ||  || — || September 25, 2005 || Kitt Peak || Spacewatch || VER || align=right | 2.6 km || 
|-id=879 bgcolor=#d6d6d6
| 474879 ||  || — || September 25, 2005 || Kitt Peak || Spacewatch || THM || align=right | 2.5 km || 
|-id=880 bgcolor=#d6d6d6
| 474880 ||  || — || September 25, 2005 || Kitt Peak || Spacewatch || — || align=right | 2.5 km || 
|-id=881 bgcolor=#d6d6d6
| 474881 ||  || — || September 25, 2005 || Kitt Peak || Spacewatch || — || align=right | 3.3 km || 
|-id=882 bgcolor=#d6d6d6
| 474882 ||  || — || September 26, 2005 || Kitt Peak || Spacewatch || — || align=right | 2.6 km || 
|-id=883 bgcolor=#d6d6d6
| 474883 ||  || — || September 27, 2005 || Kitt Peak || Spacewatch || — || align=right | 1.9 km || 
|-id=884 bgcolor=#d6d6d6
| 474884 ||  || — || September 27, 2005 || Kitt Peak || Spacewatch || — || align=right | 2.5 km || 
|-id=885 bgcolor=#d6d6d6
| 474885 ||  || — || September 29, 2005 || Kitt Peak || Spacewatch || — || align=right | 2.3 km || 
|-id=886 bgcolor=#d6d6d6
| 474886 ||  || — || September 29, 2005 || Kitt Peak || Spacewatch || — || align=right | 2.9 km || 
|-id=887 bgcolor=#fefefe
| 474887 ||  || — || September 29, 2005 || Kitt Peak || Spacewatch || — || align=right data-sort-value="0.70" | 700 m || 
|-id=888 bgcolor=#fefefe
| 474888 ||  || — || September 29, 2005 || Kitt Peak || Spacewatch || — || align=right data-sort-value="0.80" | 800 m || 
|-id=889 bgcolor=#fefefe
| 474889 ||  || — || September 29, 2005 || Kitt Peak || Spacewatch || — || align=right data-sort-value="0.69" | 690 m || 
|-id=890 bgcolor=#d6d6d6
| 474890 ||  || — || September 29, 2005 || Kitt Peak || Spacewatch || — || align=right | 2.7 km || 
|-id=891 bgcolor=#fefefe
| 474891 ||  || — || September 1, 2005 || Kitt Peak || Spacewatch || V || align=right data-sort-value="0.62" | 620 m || 
|-id=892 bgcolor=#d6d6d6
| 474892 ||  || — || September 24, 2005 || Kitt Peak || Spacewatch || — || align=right | 2.4 km || 
|-id=893 bgcolor=#d6d6d6
| 474893 ||  || — || September 29, 2005 || Kitt Peak || Spacewatch || — || align=right | 3.1 km || 
|-id=894 bgcolor=#d6d6d6
| 474894 ||  || — || September 24, 2005 || Kitt Peak || Spacewatch || — || align=right | 2.2 km || 
|-id=895 bgcolor=#d6d6d6
| 474895 ||  || — || September 29, 2005 || Kitt Peak || Spacewatch || ELF || align=right | 3.2 km || 
|-id=896 bgcolor=#d6d6d6
| 474896 ||  || — || September 29, 2005 || Kitt Peak || Spacewatch || — || align=right | 2.8 km || 
|-id=897 bgcolor=#d6d6d6
| 474897 ||  || — || September 29, 2005 || Kitt Peak || Spacewatch ||  || align=right | 2.5 km || 
|-id=898 bgcolor=#fefefe
| 474898 ||  || — || September 24, 2005 || Kitt Peak || Spacewatch || — || align=right data-sort-value="0.82" | 820 m || 
|-id=899 bgcolor=#fefefe
| 474899 ||  || — || September 29, 2005 || Kitt Peak || Spacewatch || — || align=right data-sort-value="0.74" | 740 m || 
|-id=900 bgcolor=#fefefe
| 474900 ||  || — || September 29, 2005 || Mount Lemmon || Mount Lemmon Survey || — || align=right data-sort-value="0.71" | 710 m || 
|}

474901–475000 

|-bgcolor=#d6d6d6
| 474901 ||  || — || September 29, 2005 || Mount Lemmon || Mount Lemmon Survey || EOS || align=right | 1.9 km || 
|-id=902 bgcolor=#d6d6d6
| 474902 ||  || — || September 29, 2005 || Mount Lemmon || Mount Lemmon Survey || — || align=right | 2.9 km || 
|-id=903 bgcolor=#fefefe
| 474903 ||  || — || September 30, 2005 || Kitt Peak || Spacewatch || MAS || align=right data-sort-value="0.62" | 620 m || 
|-id=904 bgcolor=#fefefe
| 474904 ||  || — || September 30, 2005 || Kitt Peak || Spacewatch || MAS || align=right data-sort-value="0.64" | 640 m || 
|-id=905 bgcolor=#fefefe
| 474905 ||  || — || August 30, 2005 || Kitt Peak || Spacewatch || — || align=right data-sort-value="0.74" | 740 m || 
|-id=906 bgcolor=#fefefe
| 474906 ||  || — || September 30, 2005 || Kitt Peak || Spacewatch || NYS || align=right data-sort-value="0.67" | 670 m || 
|-id=907 bgcolor=#d6d6d6
| 474907 ||  || — || September 30, 2005 || Palomar || NEAT || — || align=right | 2.9 km || 
|-id=908 bgcolor=#d6d6d6
| 474908 ||  || — || September 30, 2005 || Palomar || NEAT || — || align=right | 3.3 km || 
|-id=909 bgcolor=#fefefe
| 474909 ||  || — || September 30, 2005 || Palomar || NEAT || — || align=right data-sort-value="0.87" | 870 m || 
|-id=910 bgcolor=#fefefe
| 474910 ||  || — || September 30, 2005 || Mount Lemmon || Mount Lemmon Survey || NYS || align=right data-sort-value="0.55" | 550 m || 
|-id=911 bgcolor=#fefefe
| 474911 ||  || — || September 30, 2005 || Mount Lemmon || Mount Lemmon Survey || — || align=right data-sort-value="0.65" | 650 m || 
|-id=912 bgcolor=#d6d6d6
| 474912 ||  || — || September 30, 2005 || Mount Lemmon || Mount Lemmon Survey || THM || align=right | 2.1 km || 
|-id=913 bgcolor=#d6d6d6
| 474913 ||  || — || September 30, 2005 || Catalina || CSS || — || align=right | 3.0 km || 
|-id=914 bgcolor=#fefefe
| 474914 ||  || — || September 30, 2005 || Catalina || CSS || — || align=right data-sort-value="0.90" | 900 m || 
|-id=915 bgcolor=#fefefe
| 474915 ||  || — || September 30, 2005 || Anderson Mesa || LONEOS || — || align=right data-sort-value="0.82" | 820 m || 
|-id=916 bgcolor=#d6d6d6
| 474916 ||  || — || September 30, 2005 || Mount Lemmon || Mount Lemmon Survey || — || align=right | 3.4 km || 
|-id=917 bgcolor=#fefefe
| 474917 ||  || — || September 29, 2005 || Mount Lemmon || Mount Lemmon Survey || — || align=right data-sort-value="0.67" | 670 m || 
|-id=918 bgcolor=#d6d6d6
| 474918 ||  || — || September 23, 2005 || Catalina || CSS || — || align=right | 2.5 km || 
|-id=919 bgcolor=#d6d6d6
| 474919 ||  || — || September 30, 2005 || Mount Lemmon || Mount Lemmon Survey || — || align=right | 3.2 km || 
|-id=920 bgcolor=#d6d6d6
| 474920 ||  || — || September 30, 2005 || Mount Lemmon || Mount Lemmon Survey || — || align=right | 2.5 km || 
|-id=921 bgcolor=#d6d6d6
| 474921 ||  || — || September 29, 2005 || Kitt Peak || Spacewatch || — || align=right | 2.3 km || 
|-id=922 bgcolor=#fefefe
| 474922 ||  || — || September 23, 2005 || Kitt Peak || Spacewatch || — || align=right data-sort-value="0.75" | 750 m || 
|-id=923 bgcolor=#d6d6d6
| 474923 ||  || — || September 29, 2005 || Kitt Peak || Spacewatch || HYG || align=right | 2.7 km || 
|-id=924 bgcolor=#d6d6d6
| 474924 ||  || — || September 29, 2005 || Kitt Peak || Spacewatch || — || align=right | 3.0 km || 
|-id=925 bgcolor=#d6d6d6
| 474925 ||  || — || September 29, 2005 || Kitt Peak || Spacewatch || — || align=right | 3.2 km || 
|-id=926 bgcolor=#d6d6d6
| 474926 ||  || — || September 30, 2005 || Kitt Peak || Spacewatch || — || align=right | 3.2 km || 
|-id=927 bgcolor=#fefefe
| 474927 ||  || — || September 30, 2005 || Kitt Peak || Spacewatch || — || align=right data-sort-value="0.77" | 770 m || 
|-id=928 bgcolor=#d6d6d6
| 474928 ||  || — || September 30, 2005 || Kitt Peak || Spacewatch || LIX || align=right | 2.9 km || 
|-id=929 bgcolor=#d6d6d6
| 474929 ||  || — || September 30, 2005 || Mount Lemmon || Mount Lemmon Survey || THM || align=right | 2.0 km || 
|-id=930 bgcolor=#fefefe
| 474930 ||  || — || September 14, 2005 || Kitt Peak || Spacewatch || — || align=right data-sort-value="0.71" | 710 m || 
|-id=931 bgcolor=#d6d6d6
| 474931 ||  || — || September 22, 2005 || Palomar || NEAT || — || align=right | 3.1 km || 
|-id=932 bgcolor=#fefefe
| 474932 ||  || — || August 28, 2005 || Kitt Peak || Spacewatch || — || align=right data-sort-value="0.81" | 810 m || 
|-id=933 bgcolor=#fefefe
| 474933 ||  || — || September 23, 2005 || Kitt Peak || Spacewatch || MAS || align=right data-sort-value="0.61" | 610 m || 
|-id=934 bgcolor=#fefefe
| 474934 ||  || — || September 23, 2005 || Kitt Peak || Spacewatch || NYS || align=right data-sort-value="0.53" | 530 m || 
|-id=935 bgcolor=#fefefe
| 474935 ||  || — || September 27, 2005 || Kitt Peak || Spacewatch || — || align=right data-sort-value="0.73" | 730 m || 
|-id=936 bgcolor=#d6d6d6
| 474936 ||  || — || September 30, 2005 || Kitt Peak || Spacewatch || EOS || align=right | 1.7 km || 
|-id=937 bgcolor=#fefefe
| 474937 ||  || — || September 23, 2005 || Kitt Peak || Spacewatch || V || align=right data-sort-value="0.64" | 640 m || 
|-id=938 bgcolor=#d6d6d6
| 474938 ||  || — || September 26, 2005 || Kitt Peak || Spacewatch || VER || align=right | 2.3 km || 
|-id=939 bgcolor=#d6d6d6
| 474939 ||  || — || September 21, 2005 || Apache Point || A. C. Becker || LIX || align=right | 3.4 km || 
|-id=940 bgcolor=#d6d6d6
| 474940 ||  || — || September 25, 2005 || Apache Point || A. C. Becker || VER || align=right | 2.2 km || 
|-id=941 bgcolor=#d6d6d6
| 474941 ||  || — || September 25, 2005 || Apache Point || A. C. Becker || — || align=right | 2.8 km || 
|-id=942 bgcolor=#d6d6d6
| 474942 ||  || — || September 25, 2005 || Apache Point || A. C. Becker || — || align=right | 2.3 km || 
|-id=943 bgcolor=#d6d6d6
| 474943 ||  || — || September 26, 2005 || Apache Point || A. C. Becker || — || align=right | 2.7 km || 
|-id=944 bgcolor=#fefefe
| 474944 ||  || — || September 27, 2005 || Apache Point || A. C. Becker || — || align=right data-sort-value="0.62" | 620 m || 
|-id=945 bgcolor=#d6d6d6
| 474945 ||  || — || September 23, 2005 || Kitt Peak || Spacewatch || — || align=right | 3.0 km || 
|-id=946 bgcolor=#d6d6d6
| 474946 ||  || — || September 29, 2005 || Kitt Peak || Spacewatch || — || align=right | 2.5 km || 
|-id=947 bgcolor=#fefefe
| 474947 ||  || — || September 29, 2005 || Kitt Peak || Spacewatch || MAS || align=right data-sort-value="0.58" | 580 m || 
|-id=948 bgcolor=#d6d6d6
| 474948 ||  || — || October 1, 2005 || Catalina || CSS || — || align=right | 4.3 km || 
|-id=949 bgcolor=#d6d6d6
| 474949 ||  || — || October 1, 2005 || Kitt Peak || Spacewatch || THM || align=right | 2.1 km || 
|-id=950 bgcolor=#d6d6d6
| 474950 ||  || — || October 2, 2005 || Mount Lemmon || Mount Lemmon Survey || — || align=right | 2.2 km || 
|-id=951 bgcolor=#d6d6d6
| 474951 ||  || — || October 1, 2005 || Socorro || LINEAR || — || align=right | 3.1 km || 
|-id=952 bgcolor=#d6d6d6
| 474952 ||  || — || October 1, 2005 || Kitt Peak || Spacewatch || — || align=right | 3.4 km || 
|-id=953 bgcolor=#fefefe
| 474953 ||  || — || October 1, 2005 || Kitt Peak || Spacewatch || — || align=right data-sort-value="0.78" | 780 m || 
|-id=954 bgcolor=#d6d6d6
| 474954 ||  || — || October 1, 2005 || Mount Lemmon || Mount Lemmon Survey || — || align=right | 2.6 km || 
|-id=955 bgcolor=#d6d6d6
| 474955 ||  || — || October 1, 2005 || Mount Lemmon || Mount Lemmon Survey || — || align=right | 2.4 km || 
|-id=956 bgcolor=#d6d6d6
| 474956 ||  || — || October 1, 2005 || Mount Lemmon || Mount Lemmon Survey || THM || align=right | 2.0 km || 
|-id=957 bgcolor=#d6d6d6
| 474957 ||  || — || October 1, 2005 || Kitt Peak || Spacewatch || VER || align=right | 2.3 km || 
|-id=958 bgcolor=#d6d6d6
| 474958 ||  || — || October 1, 2005 || Kitt Peak || Spacewatch || THM || align=right | 1.9 km || 
|-id=959 bgcolor=#d6d6d6
| 474959 ||  || — || October 1, 2005 || Kitt Peak || Spacewatch || — || align=right | 2.5 km || 
|-id=960 bgcolor=#d6d6d6
| 474960 ||  || — || October 3, 2005 || Socorro || LINEAR || Tj (2.96) || align=right | 3.1 km || 
|-id=961 bgcolor=#d6d6d6
| 474961 ||  || — || September 23, 2005 || Kitt Peak || Spacewatch || — || align=right | 2.8 km || 
|-id=962 bgcolor=#d6d6d6
| 474962 ||  || — || October 5, 2005 || Bergisch Gladbach || W. Bickel || — || align=right | 4.3 km || 
|-id=963 bgcolor=#d6d6d6
| 474963 ||  || — || October 9, 2005 || Goodricke-Pigott || R. A. Tucker || LIX || align=right | 4.2 km || 
|-id=964 bgcolor=#d6d6d6
| 474964 ||  || — || October 1, 2005 || Mount Lemmon || Mount Lemmon Survey || — || align=right | 3.0 km || 
|-id=965 bgcolor=#fefefe
| 474965 ||  || — || October 1, 2005 || Mount Lemmon || Mount Lemmon Survey || V || align=right data-sort-value="0.60" | 600 m || 
|-id=966 bgcolor=#d6d6d6
| 474966 ||  || — || October 1, 2005 || Mount Lemmon || Mount Lemmon Survey || fast? || align=right | 2.7 km || 
|-id=967 bgcolor=#d6d6d6
| 474967 ||  || — || October 2, 2005 || Mount Lemmon || Mount Lemmon Survey || VER || align=right | 2.1 km || 
|-id=968 bgcolor=#fefefe
| 474968 ||  || — || October 3, 2005 || Catalina || CSS || (5026) || align=right | 2.2 km || 
|-id=969 bgcolor=#fefefe
| 474969 ||  || — || October 4, 2005 || Mount Lemmon || Mount Lemmon Survey || fast? || align=right data-sort-value="0.71" | 710 m || 
|-id=970 bgcolor=#fefefe
| 474970 ||  || — || October 4, 2005 || Mount Lemmon || Mount Lemmon Survey || — || align=right data-sort-value="0.83" | 830 m || 
|-id=971 bgcolor=#fefefe
| 474971 ||  || — || October 7, 2005 || Kitt Peak || Spacewatch || — || align=right | 1.1 km || 
|-id=972 bgcolor=#d6d6d6
| 474972 ||  || — || August 30, 2005 || Kitt Peak || Spacewatch || — || align=right | 2.4 km || 
|-id=973 bgcolor=#d6d6d6
| 474973 ||  || — || October 1, 2005 || Catalina || CSS || — || align=right | 2.7 km || 
|-id=974 bgcolor=#fefefe
| 474974 ||  || — || October 6, 2005 || Catalina || CSS || MAScritical || align=right data-sort-value="0.62" | 620 m || 
|-id=975 bgcolor=#d6d6d6
| 474975 ||  || — || October 3, 2005 || Kitt Peak || Spacewatch || — || align=right | 2.9 km || 
|-id=976 bgcolor=#fefefe
| 474976 ||  || — || October 3, 2005 || Catalina || CSS || NYS || align=right data-sort-value="0.56" | 560 m || 
|-id=977 bgcolor=#d6d6d6
| 474977 ||  || — || October 4, 2005 || Mount Lemmon || Mount Lemmon Survey || — || align=right | 2.4 km || 
|-id=978 bgcolor=#fefefe
| 474978 ||  || — || September 30, 2005 || Mount Lemmon || Mount Lemmon Survey || — || align=right data-sort-value="0.57" | 570 m || 
|-id=979 bgcolor=#d6d6d6
| 474979 ||  || — || October 6, 2005 || Mount Lemmon || Mount Lemmon Survey || — || align=right | 3.1 km || 
|-id=980 bgcolor=#d6d6d6
| 474980 ||  || — || October 6, 2005 || Mount Lemmon || Mount Lemmon Survey || — || align=right | 2.9 km || 
|-id=981 bgcolor=#d6d6d6
| 474981 ||  || — || September 23, 2005 || Kitt Peak || Spacewatch || — || align=right | 3.4 km || 
|-id=982 bgcolor=#d6d6d6
| 474982 ||  || — || September 29, 2005 || Kitt Peak || Spacewatch || — || align=right | 3.2 km || 
|-id=983 bgcolor=#fefefe
| 474983 ||  || — || October 3, 2005 || Socorro || LINEAR || — || align=right data-sort-value="0.89" | 890 m || 
|-id=984 bgcolor=#d6d6d6
| 474984 ||  || — || September 27, 2005 || Kitt Peak || Spacewatch || — || align=right | 2.9 km || 
|-id=985 bgcolor=#fefefe
| 474985 ||  || — || October 7, 2005 || Kitt Peak || Spacewatch || NYS || align=right data-sort-value="0.49" | 490 m || 
|-id=986 bgcolor=#d6d6d6
| 474986 ||  || — || September 26, 2005 || Kitt Peak || Spacewatch || — || align=right | 2.7 km || 
|-id=987 bgcolor=#d6d6d6
| 474987 ||  || — || October 7, 2005 || Kitt Peak || Spacewatch || — || align=right | 2.2 km || 
|-id=988 bgcolor=#d6d6d6
| 474988 ||  || — || September 29, 2005 || Mount Lemmon || Mount Lemmon Survey || — || align=right | 2.8 km || 
|-id=989 bgcolor=#d6d6d6
| 474989 ||  || — || October 7, 2005 || Kitt Peak || Spacewatch || THM || align=right | 2.1 km || 
|-id=990 bgcolor=#d6d6d6
| 474990 ||  || — || September 29, 2005 || Mount Lemmon || Mount Lemmon Survey || — || align=right | 2.5 km || 
|-id=991 bgcolor=#d6d6d6
| 474991 ||  || — || October 7, 2005 || Kitt Peak || Spacewatch || — || align=right | 2.8 km || 
|-id=992 bgcolor=#fefefe
| 474992 ||  || — || October 7, 2005 || Kitt Peak || Spacewatch || — || align=right data-sort-value="0.79" | 790 m || 
|-id=993 bgcolor=#d6d6d6
| 474993 ||  || — || October 7, 2005 || Kitt Peak || Spacewatch || — || align=right | 2.1 km || 
|-id=994 bgcolor=#d6d6d6
| 474994 ||  || — || October 7, 2005 || Kitt Peak || Spacewatch || — || align=right | 2.5 km || 
|-id=995 bgcolor=#d6d6d6
| 474995 ||  || — || October 7, 2005 || Kitt Peak || Spacewatch || — || align=right | 2.5 km || 
|-id=996 bgcolor=#d6d6d6
| 474996 ||  || — || September 25, 2005 || Kitt Peak || Spacewatch || — || align=right | 2.8 km || 
|-id=997 bgcolor=#d6d6d6
| 474997 ||  || — || September 25, 2005 || Kitt Peak || Spacewatch || — || align=right | 2.3 km || 
|-id=998 bgcolor=#fefefe
| 474998 ||  || — || October 8, 2005 || Kitt Peak || Spacewatch || NYS || align=right data-sort-value="0.52" | 520 m || 
|-id=999 bgcolor=#d6d6d6
| 474999 ||  || — || October 9, 2005 || Kitt Peak || Spacewatch || — || align=right | 2.5 km || 
|-id=000 bgcolor=#d6d6d6
| 475000 ||  || — || October 9, 2005 || Kitt Peak || Spacewatch || — || align=right | 3.0 km || 
|}

References

External links 
 Discovery Circumstances: Numbered Minor Planets (470001)–(475000) (IAU Minor Planet Center)

0474